= Anne Western =

British politician (born 1955)

Anne Western CBE (born 27 December 1955) is a Labour Party politician and former Leader of Derbyshire County Council.

== Career ==
The Labour vote is highly concentrated in north-east Derbyshire (where her council seat is); the elections results when she became Leader of Derbyshire in May 2013

=== Derbyshire County Council ===
Western represents the Barlborough and Clowne division on Derbyshire County Council. Barlborough is in Bolsover District, a traditionally Labour-voting area. She was first elected to Derbyshire County Council in 1997. She was Deputy Leader of the council from 2004-09. In the 2005 elections, her seat was uncontested. Previously, when Labour were in power, she had responsibility for Children's Services (previously Health and Social Care). She has also sat on Barlborough Parish Council. After the 2009 Derbyshire County Council election on 4 June 2009, when Labour lost 16 seats to retain 22, she became the Leader of the Labour group. In the 2009 elections, nearly all of Labour's seats were in either the districts of Bolsover, Chesterfield or North East Derbyshire.

=== Council leader ===
Western became the first female leader of Derbyshire County Council in May 2013. In the 2013 Derbyshire County Council election, Labour took 43 seats, the Conservatives 18 and the Liberal Democrats 3. She won with 1519 votes, with UKIP coming second with 526 votes.

== See also ==
- List of electoral wards in Derbyshire

Civic offices
Preceded by Andrew Lewer	Leader of Derbyshire County Council; May 2013 – May 2017	Succeeded by
Preceded by John Powell	Deputy Leader of Derbyshire County Council; 2004 – June 2009	Succeeded by Chris Jackson
