= David Mackintosh =

British Conservative politician (born 1979)

Member of Parliament for Northampton South
- In office 8 May 2015 – 3 May 2017
- Preceded by: Brian Binley
- Succeeded by: Andrew Lewer

Leader of the Northampton Borough Council
- In office 7 November 2011 – 10 October 2013
- Deputy: Mary Markham
- Preceded by: David Palethorpe
- Succeeded by: Mary Markham

Member of the Northampton Borough Council for Rectory Farm
- In office 9 May 2011 – 11 May 2015
- Preceded by: Jamie Lane
- Succeeded by: James Hill

Personal details
- Born: David James Mackintosh; 2 April 1979 (age 47) Northampton, England
- Party: Conservative
- Education: Durham University

David James Mackintosh (born 2 April 1979) is a British Conservative Party politician. He was the Member of Parliament for Northampton South from the May 2015 general election to the 2017 general election. Prior to his election to Parliament, he worked as a political consultant in the European Parliament and the Conservatives before being elected to the County and Borough councils, rising to become Leader of Northampton Borough Council in 2011.

== Education ==
Mackintosh was educated at Roade School, a state comprehensive school in Roade in Northamptonshire, followed by Durham University, where he studied Politics.

== Political career ==
Following his graduation in 2001, Mackintosh worked as a political counsellor in the European Parliament until 2004, before leaving to assume a post at Conservative Campaign Headquarters as a political consultant to the Conservative Party. He was elected to Northamptonshire County Council for Ecton Brook on 4 June 2009 and to Northampton Borough Council (NBC) for Rectory Farm in 2011. In May 2010, Mackintosh was appointed as Cabinet Member for Strategy, Communications and External Relations. He had previously held the position of Assistant Cabinet Member for Leadership and Strategic Support. He served as leader of NBC – the youngest the council has ever had – from November 2011 until his election to parliament. In addition, he served as cabinet member for Community Services.

Mackintosh was opposed to Brexit prior to the 2016 referendum.

Mackintosh was facing the prospect of being deselected by his local party but he announced he would not stand in the June 2017 general election.

== Controversies ==
=== Sale of Sekhemka statue ===
In July 2014, while Leader of Northampton Borough Council, Mackintosh was responsible for the controversial sale of the Sekhemka statue which led to the Arts Council removing accreditation from the Northampton Museums. The Ancient Egyptian statue had been given by the Marquess of Northampton to Northampton Museum around 1870.

Mackintosh was awarded the title "Philistine of the Year" by Private Eye magazine for approving the sale of the statue, which the Save Sekhemka Action Group called the "darkest cultural day in [Northampton's] history".

=== Unsecured council loan to property developer ===
When Mackintosh was leader of the borough council, the authority made a £13.5 million loan to Northampton Town Football Club, intended to pay for improvements at the club's Sixfields Stadium, including a new east stand. The project, however, collapsed with £10.25 million owed to the council.

In November 2015, both the BBC and The Guardian reported Howard Grossman, the director of a company responsible for rebuilding Sixfields Stadium, had provided a £6,195 undeclared payment to Mackintosh's election campaign. Three other businessmen with links to Grossman each reportedly made donations of £10,000 to Mackintosh's campaign; one of them told a journalist he was given the money by Grossman and had instructions to pay it to Mackintosh's parliamentary campaign fund. In September 2013, while Mackintosh was still NBC leader, the council provided an unsecured loan to the company, which went into administration owing the NBC millions of pounds.

The BBC reported the police had started an investigation into alleged irregularities surrounding the loan. On 29 July 2016, Northamptonshire Police confirmed the Electoral Commission had asked them to investigate the three donations totalling £30,000.

On 28 March 2018, the BBC reported that Mackintosh had attended a voluntary interview with police under caution on 26 March 2018. The BBC also reported that whilst attending the interview police officers attended Mackintosh's home for several hours and took items away.

In June 2021, seven people were charged under the Political Parties, Elections and Referendums Act 2000 over donations made to the Northampton South Conservative Association in 2014. In August 2021 one defendant was convicted and fined £6,000. In November 2022 two defendants pleaded guilty.

On 23 October 2023, Mackintosh and Grossman went on trial at Warwick Crown Court for not declaring the true source of the donations; the trial was expected to last for six weeks. On 21 November the same year, both Mackintosh and Grossman were acquitted of the offence.

Parliament of the United Kingdom
Preceded by Brian Binley	Member of Parliament for Northampton South; 2015–2017	Succeeded by Andrew Lewer
