= The Costume Society =

British organisation

The Costume Society is national membership organisation in the United Kingdom, formed in 1965 to promote the study and preservation of historic and contemporary dress. It publishes a scholarly journal, Costume, as well as one-off publications; and organises events and study days. It is a registered charity under English law.

== History ==
The Costume Society was formed in 1965, arising from a developing interest in the history of fashion and a desire on the part of its founders to foster serious research in an area which previously had been the domain of the amateur collector. The immediate genesis of the organisation was a meeting held at the Victoria and Albert Museum on 13 October 1964.

Its first chairman was Charles Harvard Gibbs-Smith, Keeper of the Department of Public Relations at the Victoria and Albert Museum (V&A), followed by Donald Beeson King, art historian and keeper of textiles at the V&A; Roy Strong, V&A director, Anne Buck, curator of the Gallery of Costume at Platt Hall in Manchester, and June Swann, Keeper of the Boot and Shoe Collection at the Northampton Museum and Art Gallery. James Snowden, Doreen Yarwood, historian, Naomi Tarrant, Colin McDowell, fashion writer, designer and curator, Valerie Cumming (2004–2009), Sylvia Ayton and from 2014 to 2018 Deirdre Murphy, senior curator at Kensington Palace. Vice Chair Shaun Cole acted as Interim Chair before Philip Warren (2019-2025). The Society's current Chair is Vanessa Jones, Curator of Dress at Rijksmuseum .

== Activities ==
Since 1967, the society, through Edinburgh University Press publishes its journal, Costume, twice per year. Costume is listed in the Arts and Humanities Citation Index of the Institute for Scientific Information. It organises regular conferences, study days and museum visits, and administers a number of conservation awards and bursaries.

The Costume Society distributes grants and awards aimed at students of the history and theory of dress, costume design and production as well as other related fields. The Patterns of Fashion Award honours the work of the dress historian Janet Arnold (1932–1998), a founding member of the society. The Patterns for Performance Award was launched in 2019 for students to design a period garment for a character in a performance.

They also make awards to museums and other institutions to cover the costs of conservation of objects. The Museum Work Experience Grant (MWEG) supports students seeking museum work experience with a dress collection and to help UK museums accomplish projects essential to the care, knowledge and interpretation of collections. The Yarwood Research Grant is awarded annually to a student whose final project or dissertation deals with an aspect of the history of dress.

== See also ==
- Dress history
