= Willem Pieter Hoevenaar =

Dutch painter

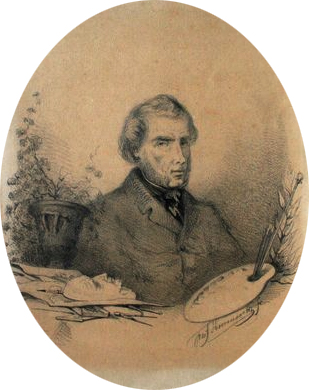
Portrait of Willem Pieter Hoevenaar by his son Jozef

Willem Pieter Hoevenaar (1808, Utrecht – 1863, Utrecht), was a 19th-century painter, draughtsman, lithographer and watercolor artist from the Northern Netherlands.

== Biography ==
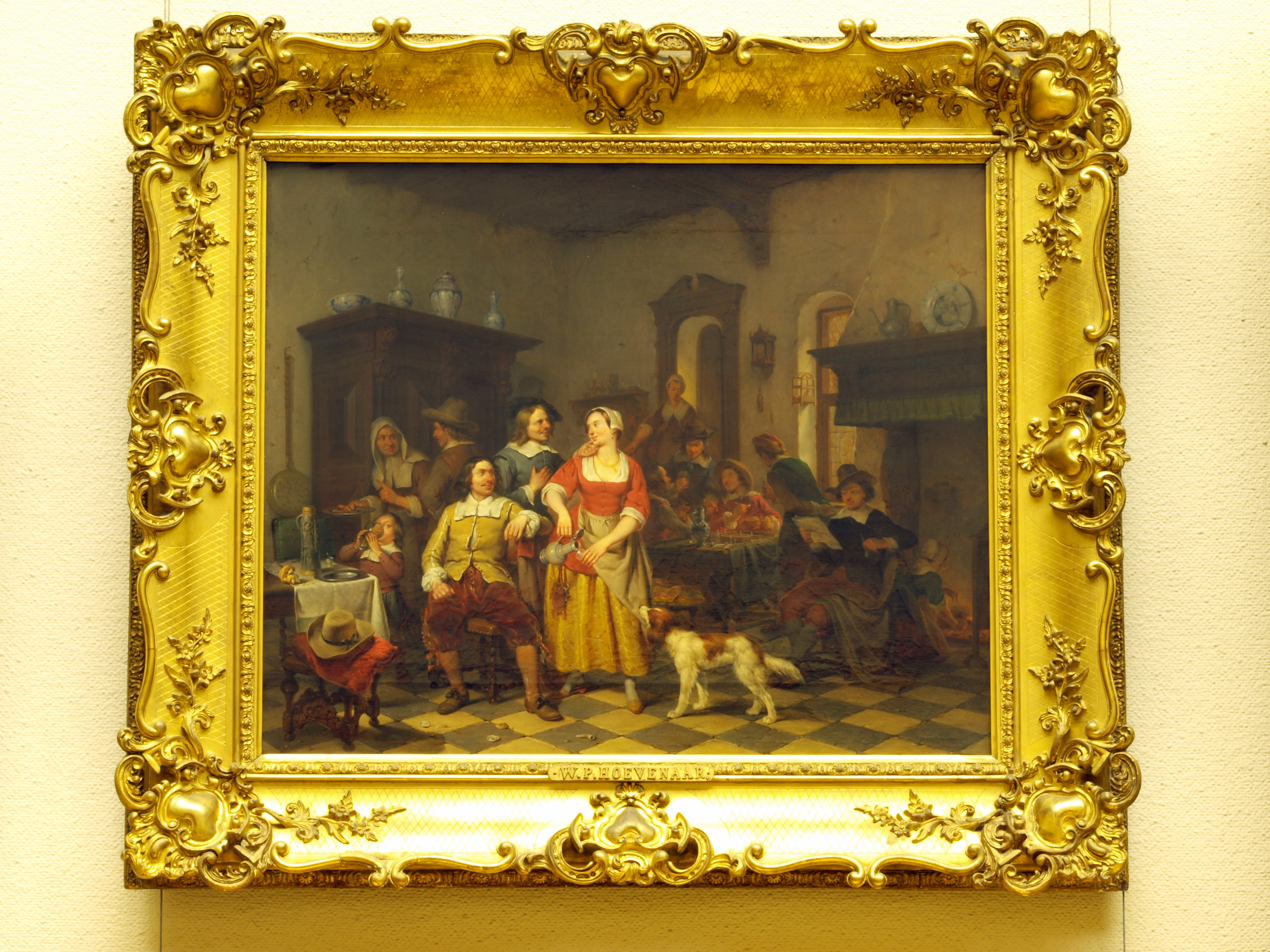
The painters Jan Steen and Frans van Mieris in a tavern, historical allegory painted in 1842, collection Teylers Museum

According to the RKD he learned to paint from his father, the painter Adriaenus Hoevenaar and later Pieter Christoffel Wonder. His brothers Cornelis Willem and Nicolaas Ludolph were also painters. His works were shown at exhibitions in The Hague and Amsterdam during the years 1828-1863, and his drawings in sepia were popular in his time. His pupils were David van der Kellen Jr. and his son Jozef Hoevenaar, who drew his portrait. He is known for genre works with figures, often portrayed in vintage Dutch costumes.
