= One guilder coin (1840–1849) =

1 Guilder
- Netherlands
- Value: 1.00 Dutch guilder
- Mass: 10.00 g
- Diameter: 28 mm
- Thickness: ? mm
- Edge: Plain, inscribed "GOD ZY MET ONS" (God be with us)
- Composition: 94,5% Ag, ?
- Years of minting: 1840~1849
- Mintage: 35,197,118 (Utrecht)
- Circulation: ?– 31 December 1931

Obverse
- Design: King William II
- Designer: David van der Kellen jr.

Reverse
- Design: Face value, year, privy mark (left), mint mark (right). Coat of arms. Country-designation.
- Designer: ?

The Dutch One guilder coin struck under the reign of King William II was a unit of currency in the Netherlands.

== History ==
After the succession of William II to the Dutch throne his portrait replaced that of William I on the obverse of the Netherlands' coins. The reverses remained the same. After some trial strikes dated 1840, production began in 1842 and continued without interruption until 1849; the year in which William II died. The year with the highest mintage was 1848, 13.6 million, or 38.7% of the total amount struck is dated 1848.

As a result of the rising silver prices after the First World War, from 1922 onward the silver content of most Dutch coins were lowered. Then, on 31 December 1931 all Dutch guilder coins struck prior to 1922 were redeemed and demonetized. The number of coins handed in this way was quite low, probably many of them had been melted down for their silver content.

== Design ==
The design of the reverse of the guilder coin did not change from 1818 to 1945.

The obverse depicts:

- Portrait of William II facing left, with the artist's signature in the lower right corner of his neck.
- Title of William II: "WILLEM II KONING DER NEDERLANDEN Groot.Hertog.Van.Luxemburg."; (William II, king of the Netherlands, Grand Duke of Luxembourg)

The edge: Plain, inscribed "GOD ZY MET ONS" (God be with us)

The reverse depicts:

- The year of mintage
- Value (1 – G). Also (100 c.) was put under the coat of arms, thus was done to help people adjust to the decimal system (introduced in 1816)
- Privy mark (left of the coat of arms), of the director of the Utrecht-mint.
- Mint mark (right of the coat of arms) of the Utrecht-mint.
- The Crowned Dutch coat of arms.
- Country-designation: "MUNT VAN HET KONINGRIJK DER NEDERLANDEN"; (Coin of the kingdom of the Netherlands)
