= Mike Reader =

British politician

Mike Reader MP
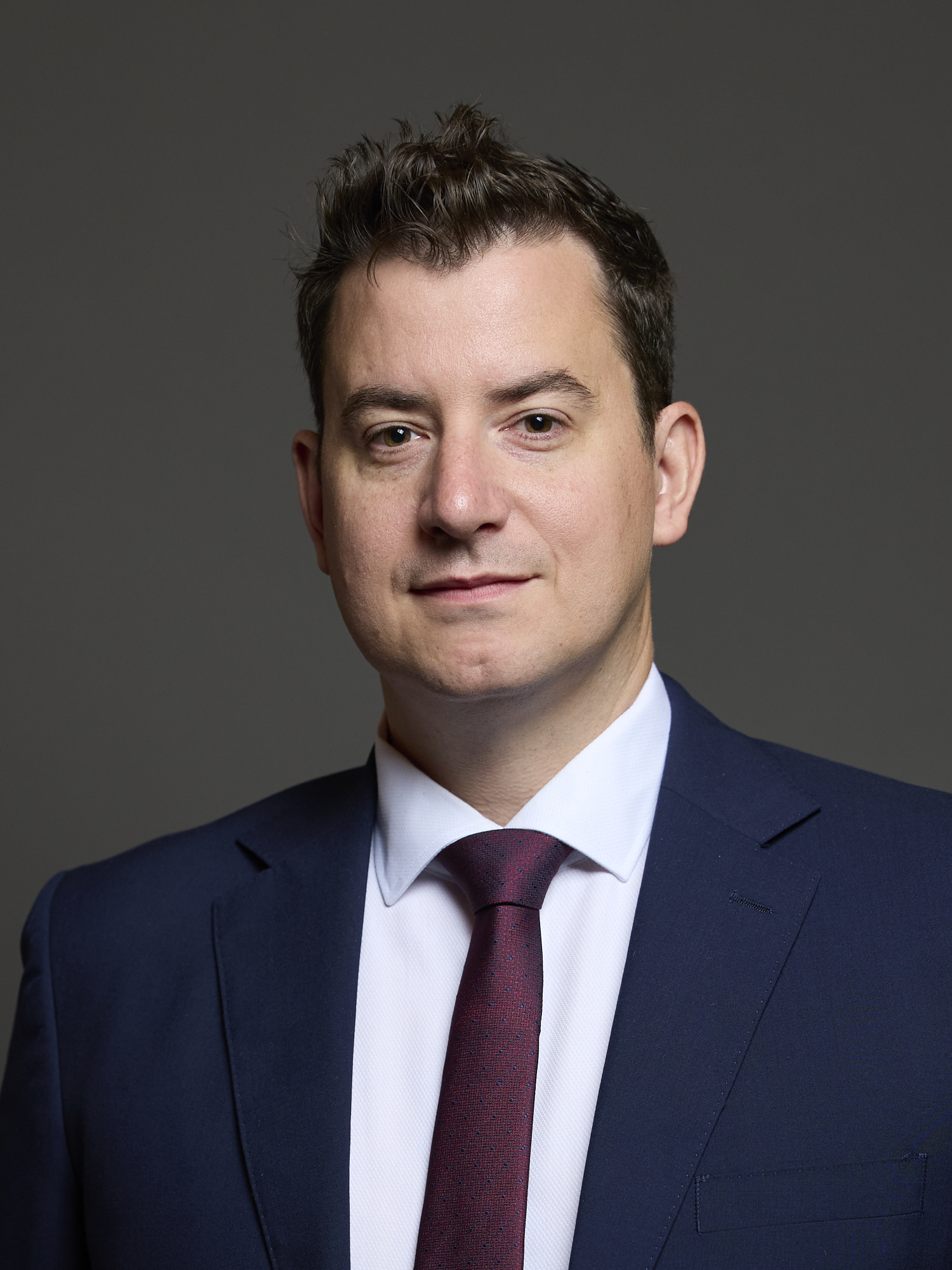
- Official portrait, 2024

Member of Parliament for Northampton South
- Incumbent
- Assumed office 4 July 2024
- Preceded by: Andrew Lewer
- Majority: 4,071 (9.3%)

Personal details
- Party: Labour

Michael Reader is a British Labour Party politician who has been the Member of Parliament for Northampton South since 2024.

== Early life and career ==
Reader studied civil engineering, graduating from Loughborough University in 2007 and then gaining an MSc at Coventry University in 2009. He worked at construction consultancy Pick Everard for 10 years. While there, he helped found Perfect Circle, a joint venture with Gleeds and Aecom which created 500 jobs in the East Midlands. He later told Construction News that his political ambitions were sparked while working for Pick Everard during the 2010–2015 Conservative-led coalition government: "I could see first-hand what public sector cuts meant on the ground, in terms of fixing schools with leaky roofs, repurposing hospitals and road and infrastructure maintenance".

In 2017, he then joined the Mace construction business, where he worked for over six years. At Mace during the COVID-19 pandemic, he worked on a NHS Nightingale project as the construction team's operations director.

== Political career ==
Selected to contest the Northampton South seat in March 2023, Reader took a sabbatical from his job at Mace during the 2024 general election campaign; he said he expected to leave Mace if he was elected. He gained the seat from Andrew Lewer, a Conservative. He made his maiden speech in the House of Commons on 5 September 2024. Mike was sponsored by Labour Friends of Israel to visit Israel in March 2024.

On 27 November 2024, Reader was elected as the new chair of the All-Party Parliamentary Group on Infrastructure. In February 2026, the Department for Business and Trade named Reader as its business champion for construction, though the role was later (September 2026) scrapped.

On 19 August 2025, it was reported by the Daily Mirror that Reader had used the artificial intelligence (AI) application ChatGPT to respond to letters from constituents. Reader responded by saying he “takes his responsibilities seriously when it comes to handling his constituents' data.”

Parliament of the United Kingdom
Preceded by Andrew Lewer	Member of Parliament for Northampton South; 2024–	Incumbent
