= Hendrik van Oort =

Dutch painter

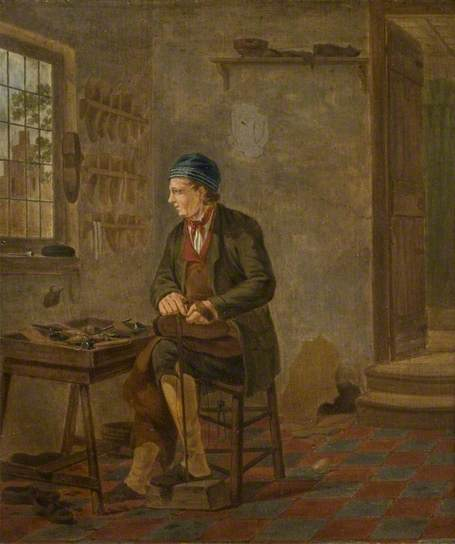
The Shoemaker, (1800-1830), Northampton Museum and Art Gallery

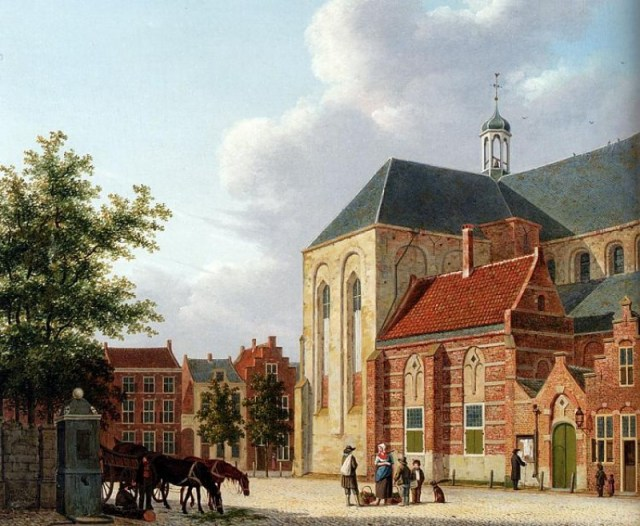
A view of the Pieterskerk, Utrecht, (1824) private collection

Hendrik van Oort (6 August 1775 in Utrecht – 17 February 1847 in Utrecht) was a 19th-century painter from the Netherlands. Among his best known works are In the Meadow and The Shoemaker (1800-1830), the latter of which is on display at the Northampton Museum and Art Gallery.

Mainly a landscape painter, van Oort chose mainly quaint rural villages, small towns and rural folk as his subjects. But he also captured landscapes of cities such as Amsterdam; his landscape View of Canal, Amsterdam sold at the Amsterdam branch of Christie's on September 5, 2000, for $3,353. A View Of The Sint Jan's Kerkhof was painted at Utrecht in 1824. Henrik's son, Pieter van Oort, was also a noted landscape artist and architect. Besides his son he taught the painter David van der Kellen Jr. (1804–1879), who became a respected medalist and engraver.
