= Anne Buck =

British costume historian and curator (1910–2005)

Anne Buck (14 May 1910 – 12 May 2005) was a British cultural historian and curator of dress, who established the Gallery of Costume at Platt Hall in Manchester. She was a leading scholar of dress, who was a founder member and long-time chairman of the Costume Society, and author of many books and papers on the history of dress. She was described as "a towering presence, her contribution to her subject matched by only a handful of outstanding individuals world-wide in the twentieth century".

== Biography ==
Anne Buck was born in Harpenden, Hertfordshire on 14 May 1910. She attended St Albans High School for Girls and then Bedford College, London. After graduating in 1932, she took employment with the Times Book Club in London.

In 1938, she joined Luton Museum, a speciality of which was the history of lace-making and straw hat manufacture - both trades formerly commonplace in its environs - and about which she became expert. In 1947 she moved Manchester to become the founding curator of the Gallery of Costume at Platt Hall, which had acquired a large collection of 19th century dress amassed by Cecil Willett Cunnington and Phillis Emily Cunnington. There, over the course of 25-years, she established what became a model for the curation and dissemination of information about dress, helping to transform what had been a twee and amateur pursuit into a rigorous academic discipline characterised by well-researched, factual and unsentimental expositions.

Anne Buck was a founder-member of The Costume Society in 1964. She retired from the Gallery in 1972, a year after being awarded an OBE, and now dedicated her time to research, publication, and to the development of scholarship of dress. She was Chairman of The Society for Folk Life Studies from 1972 to 1975, and Chairman of the Costume Society for six years between 1974 and 1980. She published Dress In 18th-Century England in 1979, described as 'masterly' and dealing with the dress of 'actual people' (as opposed to the well-off), and detailing how clothes were worn and of what they were made.

In retirement, her home in Bedfordshire became a nexus for dress scholarship. She was honoured by publication of a Costume Society journal in 1980 dedicated to her; and in 1997 by a history of dress conference in Manchester marking the 50th anniversary of her appointment at Platt Hall.

Buck died after some ill health at the age of 95 in 2005. Tributes to her work and life were abundant.

Anne Buck's work at Platt Hall, and her approach to the curation of dress, was critiqued at length by Eleanor Wood in her 2016 PhD thesis, Displaying Dress: New Methodologies for Historic Collections, which "examines the traditional display methodologies of historic costume museums, using the [Platt Hall] Gallery of Costume as its primary case study of practice."

== Selected publications ==
=== Books ===
- Buck, Anne: Victorian Costume and Costume Accessories (1961).
- Buck, Anne, Cunnington, Phyllis: Children’s Costume in England 1300–1900 (1965)
- Buck, Anne: Dress in Eighteenth Century England (1979)
- Buck, Anne: Thomas Lester, His Lace and the East Midlands Industry 1820–1905 (1981)
- Buck, Anne: Victorian Costume and Costume Accessories (2nd edition, 1984)
- Buck, Anne: In the Cause of English Lace: the Life and Work of Catherine C. Channer 1874–1949 (1991)
- Buck, Anne: Clothes and the Child: A Handbook of Children’s Dress in England 1500–1900 (1996)

=== Papers ===
Anne Buck published some 45 articles, book chapters and short books, which are listed in her Costume Society obituary.
