= Andrew Lewer =

British politician (born 1971)

Andrew Lewer MBE
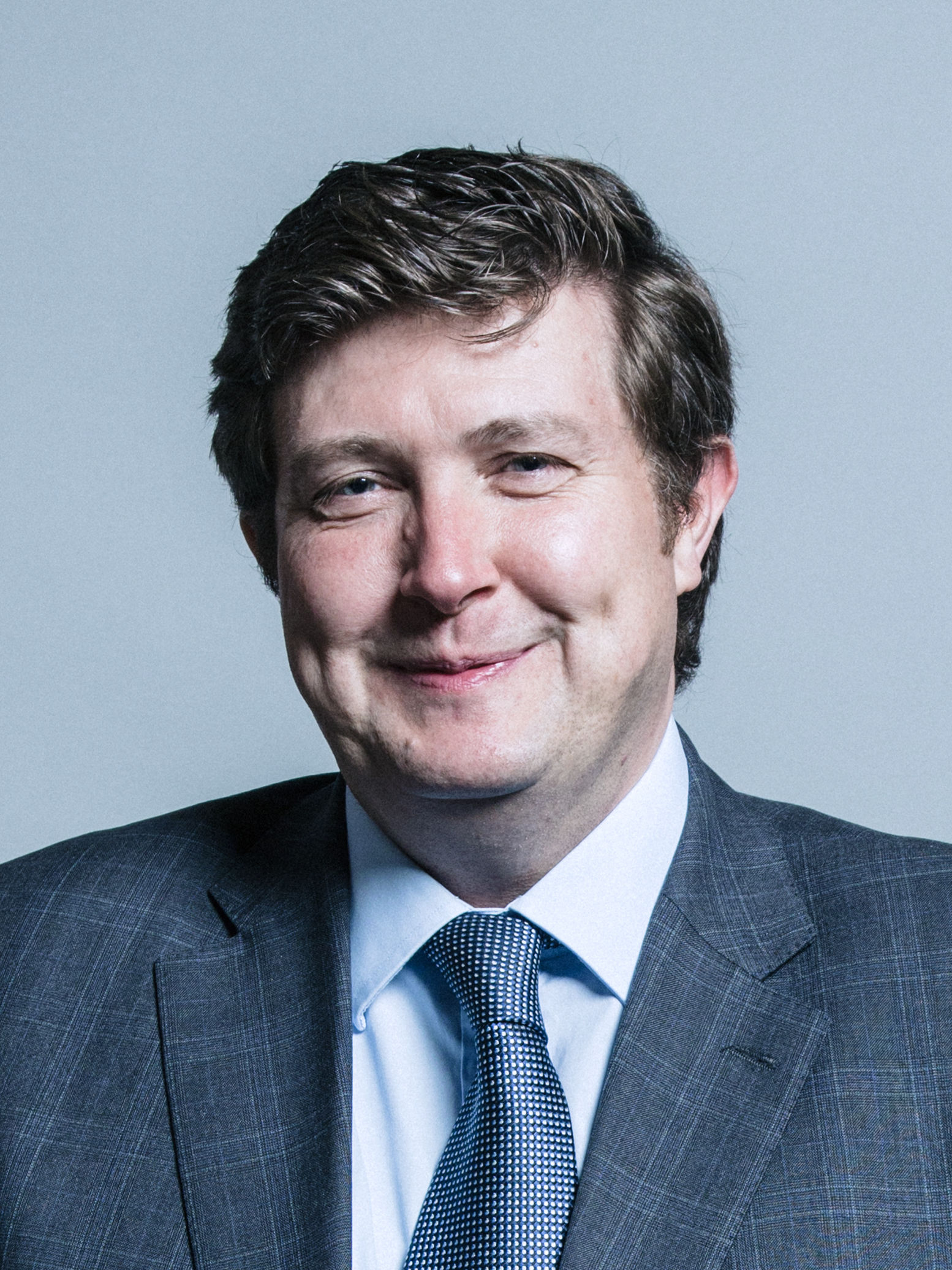

Member of Parliament for Northampton South
- In office 8 June 2017 – 30 May 2024
- Preceded by: David Mackintosh
- Succeeded by: Mike Reader

Member of the European Parliament for East Midlands
- In office 1 July 2014 – 8 June 2017
- Preceded by: Bill Newton Dunn
- Succeeded by: Rupert Matthews

Leader of Derbyshire County Council
- In office June 2009 – May 2013
- Preceded by: John Williams
- Succeeded by: Anne Western

Member of Derbyshire County Council for Ashbourne
- In office 5 May 2005 – 7 May 2015
- Preceded by: R Caswell
- Succeeded by: Stephen Bull

Personal details
- Born: 18 July 1971 (age 55) Burnley, Lancashire, England
- Party: Conservative
- Education: Newcastle University
- Website: www.andrewlewer.com

Andrew Iain Lewer MBE (born 18 July 1971 in Burnley, Lancashire) is a British Conservative Party politician who served as the Member of Parliament for Northampton South from 2017 to 2024, and as Member of the European Parliament for the East Midlands from 2014 to 2017.

He lost his seat in the 2024 General Election to Mike Reader of the Labour Party.

He was the Chairman of 7 All Party Parliamentary Groups, including Motor Neurone Disease, Venezuela, Independent Education, Devolution, Publishing, SME Housebuilders, and the Private Rented Sector. He was also a member of the Levelling Up, Housing and Communities Select Committee, as well as the Education Select Committee.

== Early life and career ==
Lewer was born 18 July 1971 in Burnley, Lancashire. He attended Queen Elizabeth's Grammar School in Ashbourne, Derbyshire, before studying history at Newcastle University. He then entered into a career in publishing.

Living in Derbyshire, Lewer was elected as a Conservative Party Councillor to Derbyshire Dales District Council for the Ashbourne South ward in 2003 and then to Derbyshire County Council for the Ashbourne division in 2005. He became Group Leader in 2007. The Conservatives took control of Derbyshire County Council in 2009, making Lewer the youngest county council leader in the country at the time. As Leader of the County Council, he also became Chairman of the Derwent Valley Mills World Heritage Site committee, the founding Chairman of the Health and Wellbeing Board and a founding director of the Local Enterprise Partnership for Derbyshire and Nottinghamshire.

Although he was re-elected as a councillor, in the 2013 elections Labour regained control of Derbyshire County Council and Lewer lost his position as Council Leader. He was awarded an MBE for services to local government in 2014. At the conclusion of his four-year term of office as Leader of Derbyshire County Council, Andrew Lewer became one of the vice-presidents of the Local Government Association (LGA), a position he still held in 2020.

== Member of the European Parliament ==
Lewer was elected to the European Parliament representing the East Midlands in 2014, replacing the former Conservative MEP Roger Helmer, who had defected to UKIP. Lewer was appointed to the Regional Development Committee and the Culture Committee as spokesperson for the European Conservative and Reformists Group in 2014. He supported Brexit, as he felt that David Cameron had failed to gain any meaningful concessions from his European counterparts.

== Member of Parliament ==
In May 2017, Lewer was selected to run as the new Conservative Party candidate for the Northampton South parliamentary constituency after the sitting Conservative MP David Mackintosh stood down. Although not from Northampton, Lewer represented Northamptonshire within his East Midlands region as an MEP.

Lewer was subsequently elected Member of Parliament for Northampton South in the 2017 general election. He won with 46.9% of the vote and a majority of 1,159. Following his election win, he stood down as an MEP and was replaced by former author Rupert Matthews.

In February 2018, following the announcement that Northamptonshire County Council had brought in a section 114 notice, putting it in special measures following a crisis in its finances, Lewer was one of seven local MPs who released a statement expressing 'no confidence' in the council's leadership. In August 2018, Lewer broke ranks with the other MPs and said that while mismanagement had fuelled the Northamptonshire crisis, the council was also a victim of underlying financial pressures affecting all local authorities with social care responsibilities.

In March 2018, Lewer was criticised by local campaigners over cuts to library services in Northampton. Lewer responded that he had been far from silent on the issue and that he had been a long-standing critic of the leadership of the council.

In Parliament, he served on the European Scrutiny Committee and the Housing, Communities and Local Government Committee, during his first mandate.

During the meaningful vote period, Lewer voted against the government twice before voting for it a third time when faced with Theresa May reneging on her commitment to take the UK out of the EU on 29 March 2019. During the subsequent leadership election, Lewer supported Esther McVey and then Boris Johnson.

Lewer during his time as an MEP

At the 2019 general election, Lewer was re-elected with an increased vote share of 51.2% and an increased majority of 4,697. Following the election, Lewer was appointed as Parliamentary Private Secretary (PPS) to the Home Office, having previously served after Boris Johnson was elected as PPS to the Northern Ireland Office, the Wales Office and the Scotland Office.

Following an interim report on the connections between colonialism and properties now in the care of the National Trust, including links with historic slavery, Lewer was among the signatories of a letter to The Telegraph in November 2020 from the "Common Sense Group" of Conservative Parliamentarians. The letter accused the National Trust of being "coloured by cultural Marxist dogma, colloquially known as the 'woke agenda'".

In December 2020 Lewer was fired from his PPS post for leaking information to the press, after a canary trap. Lewer denied leaking, but suggested the leak could have come from a member of his staff. Six weeks later, he was re-elected as a Member of the Levelling Up, Housing and Communities Select Committee.

In January 2021 Lewer wrote an open letter to the Northamptonshire Chief Constable asking that the Police do not focus on 'soft targets' for Covid fines.

In November 2021, as Chair of the All-Party Parliamentary Group on Motor Neurone Disease, Lewer welcomed the fulfilment of the Group's 'United to End MND' campaign with the Government's commitment of £50 million towards the establishment of a Motor Neurone Disease Research Institute.

In December 2021 Lewer backed the campaign to build a monument to commemorate the efforts of the Photographic Reconnaissance Unit, a former pilot of which, George Pritchard, lives in his Northampton South constituency.

During the July 2022 Conservative Party leadership election, Lewer helped form the campaign team of Kemi Badenoch.

In October 2022, Andrew Lewer was elected unopposed to the Education Select Committee. Since his appointment he has questioned Secretary of State Rt Hon Gillian Keegan MP about her lack of support for new grammar schools but supported her defence of not levying VAT on independent school fees.

Lewer led a Westminster Hall debate on 10 May 2023 on small and medium sized housebuilders, highlighting the reduction of their number in the last fifteen years. On 21 February 2024, he led a Westminster Hall debate opposing Labour proposals to levy VAT on independent schools, highlighting the risk to special schools in particular.

In December 2023 Lewer authored a report for the Centre for Policy Studies "Choices for Children" where he described the benefits of boarding schools for some children in local authority care.

He lost his seat in the 2024 General Election to Mike Reader of the Labour Party, sharing in the nationwide collapse in the Conservative vote. Reader had a majority of 4,000.

== Post-parliamentary career ==
Following his defeat at the 2024 UK General Election, Lewer has worked as Director of Partnerships at Kindred Nurseries, and as UK Senior Adviser for consultancy firm Noble + Eaton.

== Personal life ==
Lewer is married and has a son. He is an honorary Alderman of the county of Derbyshire, where he was based before being elected as an MP. He is the only person in the UK to have served as a Council Leader, MEP and MP.

Parliament of the United Kingdom
Preceded by David Mackintosh	Member of Parliament for Northampton South; 2017–2024	Succeeded by Mike Reader
Civic offices
Preceded by John Williams	Leader of Derbyshire County Council; June 2009 – May 2013	Succeeded by Anne Western
