= Cornelis Willem Hoevenaar =

Dutch painter

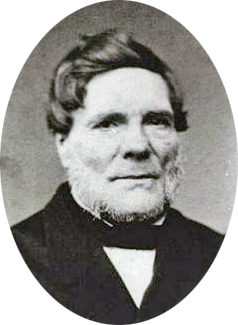
Cornelis Willem Hoevenaar

Cornelis Willem Hoevenaar (1802, Utrecht – 1873, Utrecht), was a 19th-century painter from the Netherlands.

== Biography ==
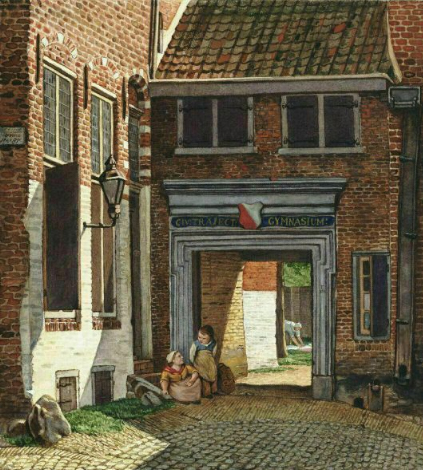
The entrance to the Utrecht boys' school Gymnasium

According to the RKD he learned to paint from his father, the painter Adriaenus Hoevenaar and later Christiaan van Geelen. His brothers Willem Pieter and Nicolaas Ludolph were also painters. He became a member of the Royal Academy in Amsterdam in 1847. His son Cornelis Willem Hoevenaar the younger also became a painter. Like his brother Willem Pieter, he is known for genre works with figures, often portrayed in vintage Dutch costumes, but he also made fruit and flower still lifes and church interiors.
