= June Swann =

British footwear historian (1929–2025)

- Born: 1929
- Died: 21 November 2025 (aged 95–96); Northampton, England
- Occupation: Footwear historian
- Awards: Member of the Most Excellent Order of the British Empire

June Marion Swann MBE (1929 – 21 November 2025) was a British footwear historian, formerly the Keeper of the Boot and Shoe Collection at the Northampton Museum and Art Gallery in England, where she worked for 38 years from 1950 to 1988.

== Career ==
=== Northampton Museum ===
Swann graduated with a degree in geography in 1949, and began to work at Northampton Museum and Art Gallery the following year. The town was a historical center for the production of shoes, and she took charge of curating the museum's collection of shoes and related artefacts, the world's largest collection of historical footwear, with the title of Keeper of the Shoe and Boot collection. In the late 1950s she inaugurated the study of shoes hidden in buildings as charms, starting a collection of found shoes and the Hidden Shoe Index at the Northampton Museum. Swann has been called "the world's leading authority on historic shoes". She became a Member of the Order of the British Empire in 1976, for her work at Northampton Museum.

She was a founder member of The Costume Society, and its chairman from 1980 to 1987.

=== Retirement and freelance work ===
She retired in 1988 and became a freelance consultant. After retirement she travelled to Sydney to catalogue the Joseph Box Collection at the Powerhouse Museum. She also assisted with the cataloguing of the Cordwainers College Historical Shoe Collection, from 1992 to 2000. She was engaged by museums around the world to identify shoes in their collections.

== Death ==
Swann died on 21 November 2025, at the age of 95–96.

== Publications ==
- Shoes concealed in buildings, Northampton County Council, 1970
- A history of shoe fashions, Northampton County Council, 1975
- Shoe Buckles: Catalogue of Shoe and other Buckles in the Northampton Museum, Northampton Borough Council, 1981
- Shoes, Batsford Books, 1982.
- Shoemaking, Shire Books, 1987. Reprinted 1993, 1997, 2003, 2008.
- "Shoes Concealed in Buildings", Costume Society Journal 30 (1996), pp. 56–69.
- History of Footwear in Norway, Sweden and Finland: Pre-history to 1950, Coronet Books, 2001.

== See also ==
- Concealed shoes
