= Northampton Sekhemka statue =

Ancient Egyptian statue

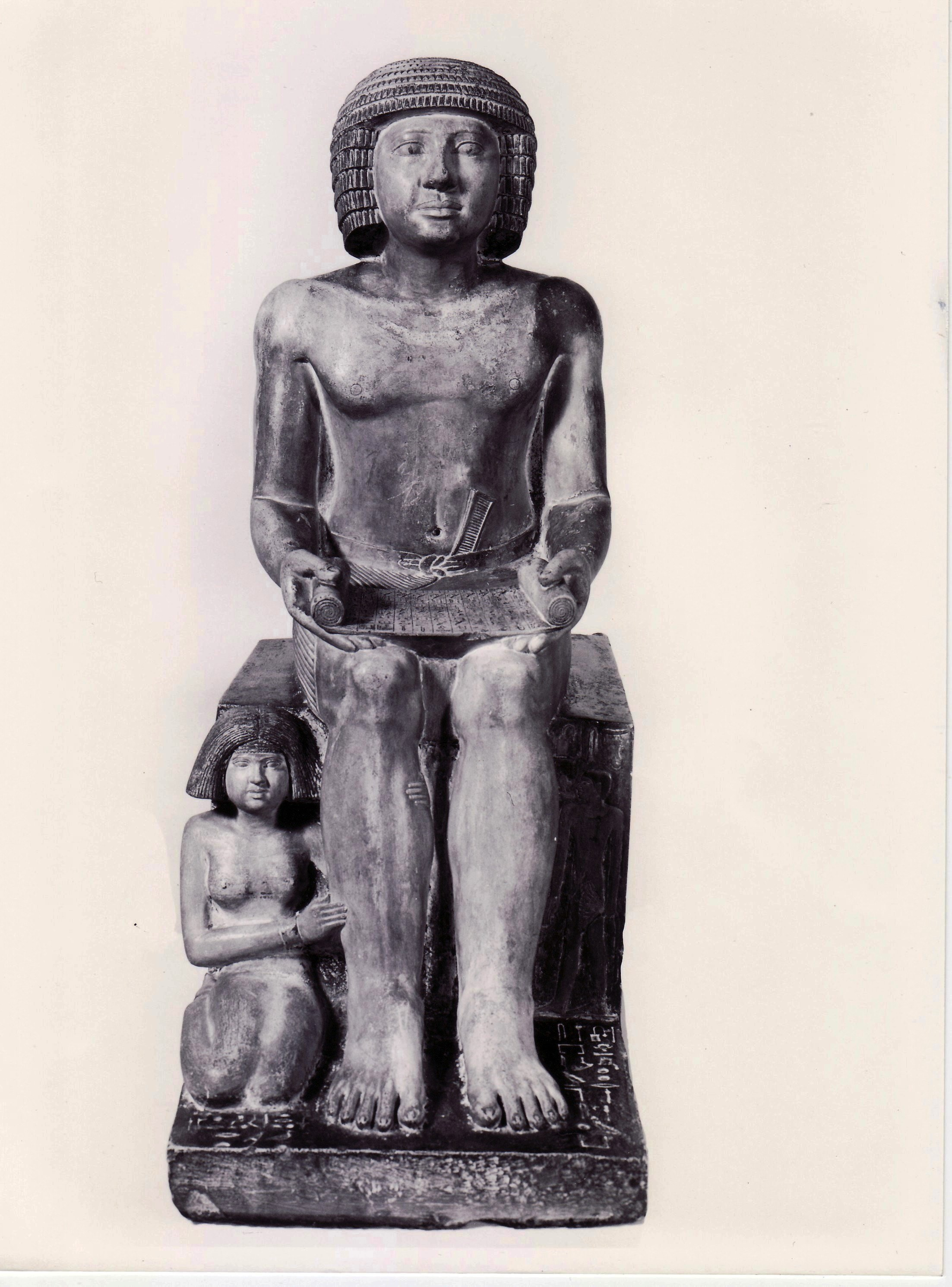
- Statue of Sekhemka
- Height: 75 cm
- Width: 43 cm
- Created: c. 2420 BC
- Discovered: c. 1850

The Northampton Sekhemka statue is an ancient Egyptian artefact, given by the Marquess of Northampton to Northampton Museum, in or around 1870. The statue dates from the 5th dynasty (c. 2494–2345 BC, making it slightly older than Stonehenge) and depicts Sekhemka the scribe with his wife, Sitmerit. It was the subject of a controversial sale in July 2014, that raised questions of the museum's ownership and the ethics of selling artefacts. The statue was sold to an unidentified buyer for £15.76m, which broke the world record for Ancient Egyptian art at auction. On 1 August 2014, Northampton Museums had their accreditation removed by Arts Council England, which ruled that the sale did not meet the accredited standards for museums in managing their collections.

== Description ==
The statue depicts Sekhemka sitting in a traditional scribal pose and holding on his knees a partly unrolled papyrus which lists various offerings. He is named in an inscription on the plinth of his statue as "Inspector of Scribes in the House of Largesse, one revered before the Great God". His wife Sit-Merit is shown sitting at his feet. The limestone statue is 75 centimetres (30 in) tall with the base from front to rear being 43 centimetres (17 in). Archaeologist Mike Pitts, editor of British Archaeology, took many detailed colour photographs of the statue whilst it was on display in Christie's prior to auction and has published them on his own blog.

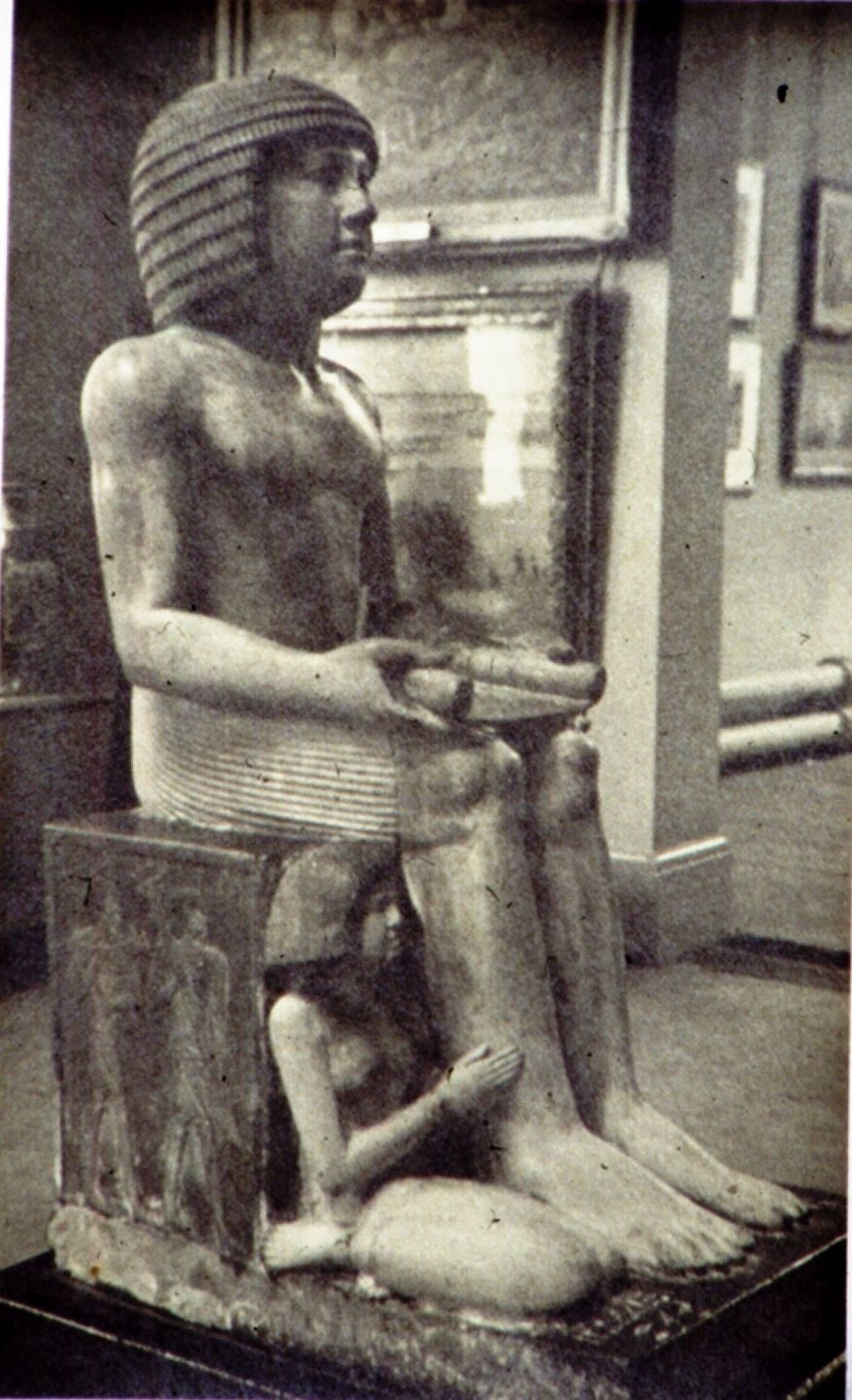
Statue of Sekhemka on display in Northampton Museum and Art Gallery 1950s

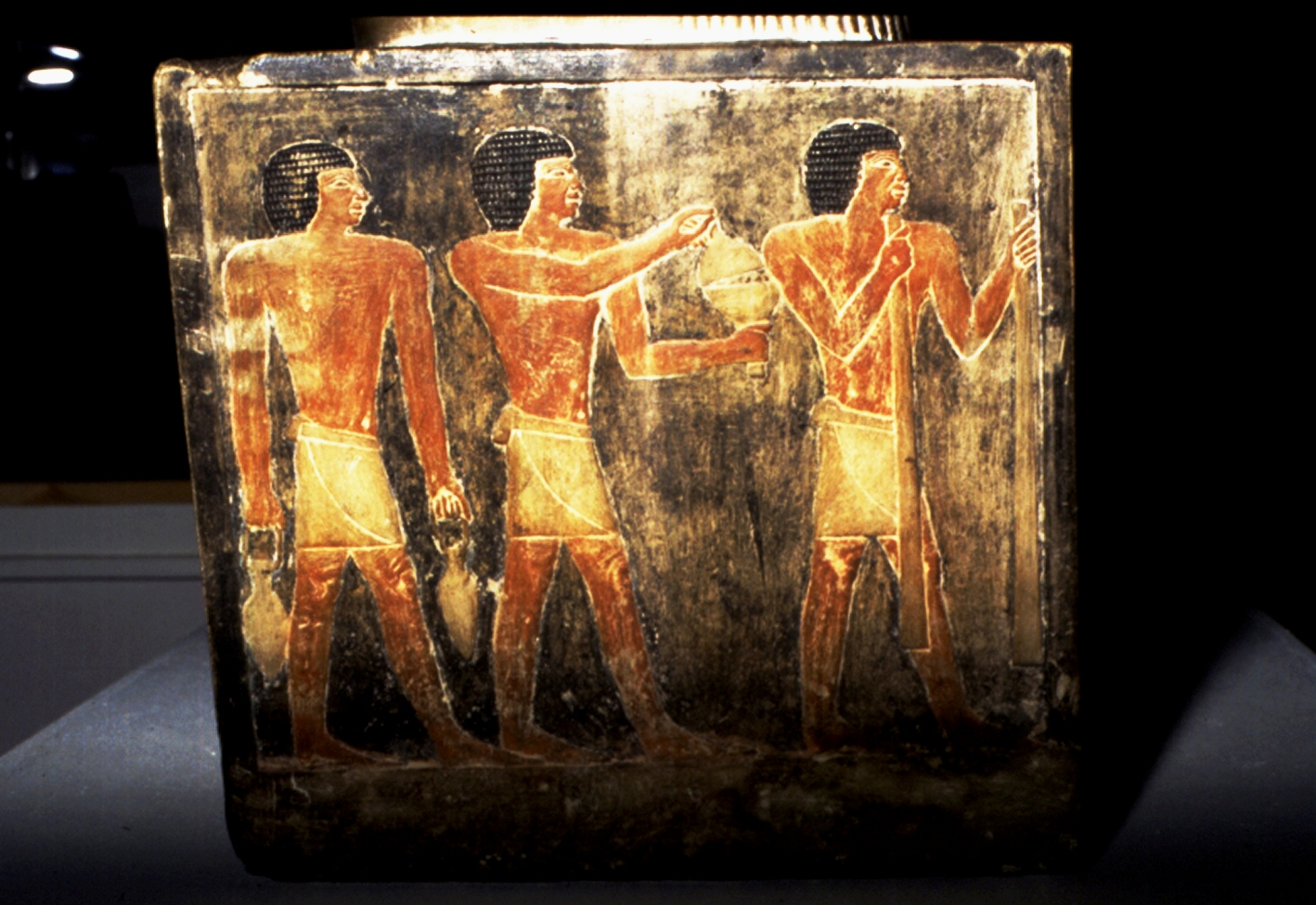
Bearers of Offerings, Statue of Sekhemka

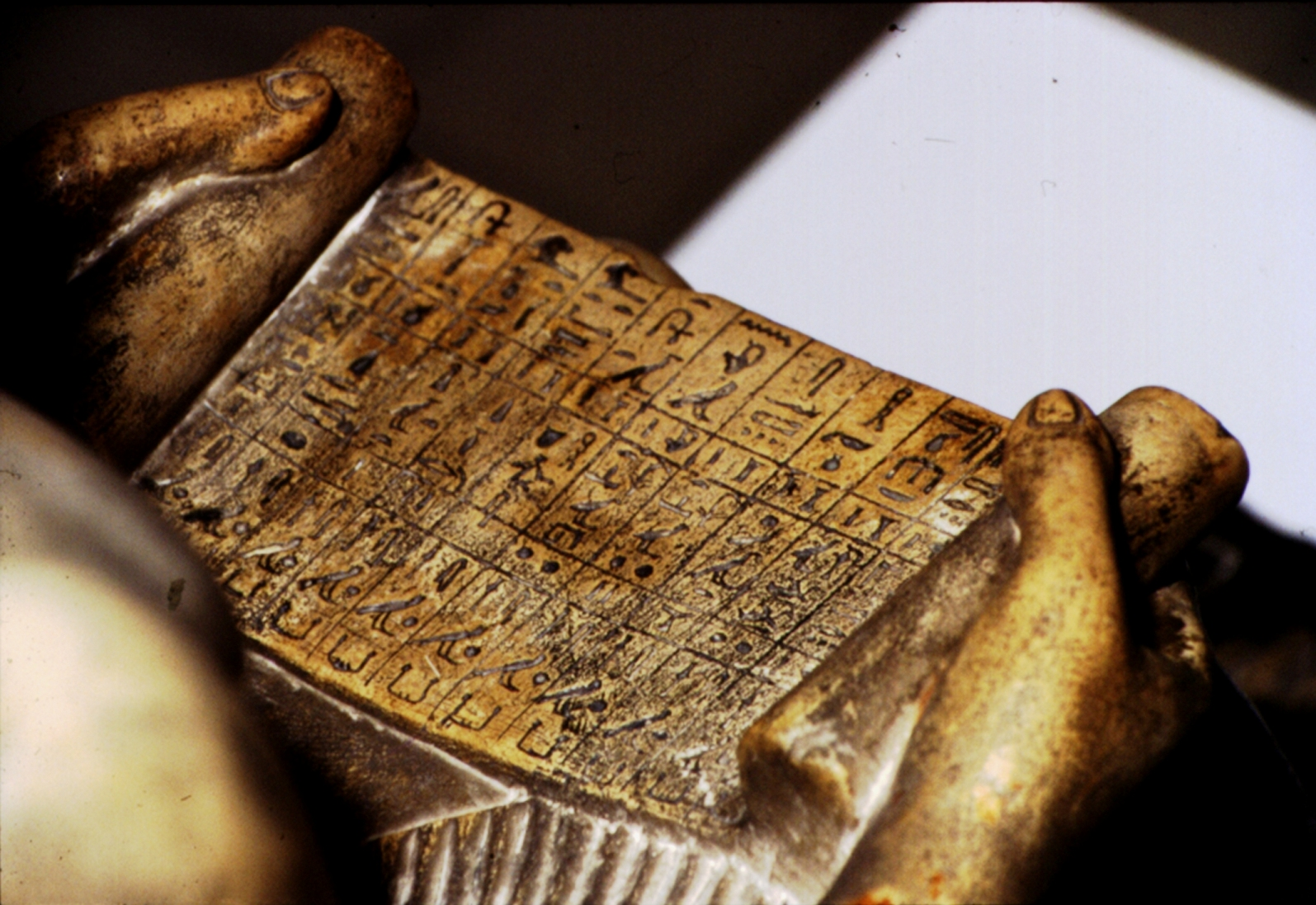
Sekhemka holding a papyrus roll asking for offerings in the Afterlife

== Provenance ==
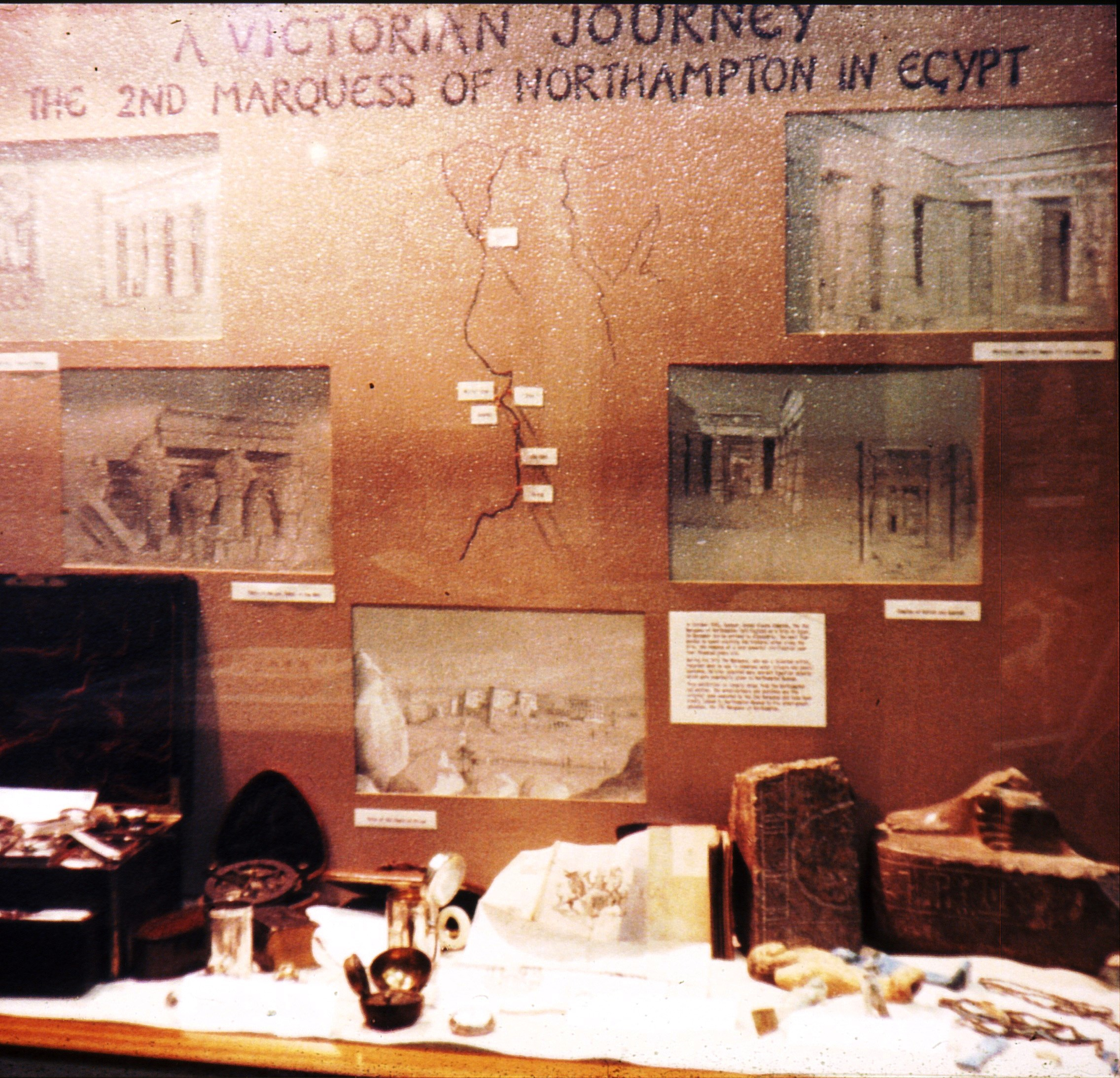
Display case from "Ancient Egypt: The Northampton Collection" 1987

The statue's provenance is unclear. Al-Ahram Weekly reports that one account describes the statue as being acquired by Northampton Museum in 1849 from the Ottoman sultan, while another version holds that it was acquired by the 2nd Marquess of Northampton during a trip to Egypt, after which his son offered it to Northampton Museum in the 19th century. T. G. H. James noted in 1961 that Northampton Museum held no precise information regarding the acquisition of the statue, but that it was presented to the museum around 1870 by the 3rd Marquess of Northampton and, based on a record from 1899, it is likely to have been acquired by the 2nd Marquess during a trip to Egypt in 1850.

== Controversial sale ==
Northampton Borough Council claimed that they learned the full value of the Sekhemka statue in 2012 during an insurance assessment, and according to The Daily Telegraph it "immediately began making plans to cash it in and use the money for other heritage projects in the region." The then leader of Northampton Borough Council, David Mackintosh, told the BBC that the statue had "been in our ownership for over 100 years and it's never really been the centrepiece of our collection", and that "We want to expand our museum and to do that we need to raise the money". The council proposed to use the amount realized through a sale for funding "the restoration of Delapré Abbey, improvements to the museum service and/or other cultural or heritage projects" but the Museum Association asked that proposed sale be halted pending consultation which "was needed to establish the financially motivated disposal was 'last resort'"

=== Security concerns ===
The council stated that when the statue was valued in 2010 it was taken off display because of security concerns, and that it would have required 24-hour guarding. However, Axa Art Insurance Ltd subsequently reported that the cabinet display previously used in Northampton Museum was "adequate". The council were also asked "why, when the Friends of Northampton Museum and Art Gallery offered £8,000 to buy a new cabinet, was the offer not taken up?" but did not reply to this specific question.

=== Public consultation ===
In October 2012, the council published the results of a petition that was signed by 199 (average of all petitions 193 as of July 2014):

We the undersigned petition the council to Reconsider the proposed sale of Sekhemka in view of the comments below it is believed that the proposed sale will have a profound detrimental effect on Northampton Museums, is against the intentions of the original Donors, will possibly cause the Museums to lose both Accredited and Designated Status and this lose access to significant public funding.

Northampton Borough Council claimed in January 2013 to have sought the views of the public regarding the proposed sale of the statue, but the form this took was criticised by the Museum Associations ethics committee:

In particular, the questionnaire just asks respondents to tick which area of investment the sale proceeds should go to. It does not ask people whether the sale should go ahead, and does not "acknowledge the historical importance of the object to the museum."

Nevertheless, the BBC repeated the council's claim that the consultation indicated that of the 173 replies 51% were in favour and 49% were against the sale. No question in the consultation document asked whether the statue should be sold or not; however, those who participated in the consultation could leave optional narrative comments, and the council used these to claim a small majority in favour of selling the statue. The Save Sekhemka Action Group objected to the methods used in the consultation document:

In order to get a better picture of the public’s opinion the Action Group hereby launches its OWN survey; it does take NBC’s views into account but also offers an opportunity for sensible and detailed answers.

The Save Sekhemka Action Group reported that their own survey showed "overwhelming support for protecting the museum's accredited status and keeping the statue".

The Northampton Chronicle and Echo carried out a Facebook poll in June 2014, and found that the majority wanted to keep the statue.

=== Private deal between Council and Lord Northampton ===
The present Lord Northampton originally protested at the decision of Northampton Borough Council to sell the statue. However, the BBC reported that, following negotiations lasting a year, he struck a private deal with the council which resulted in him receiving £6 million from the sale. Northampton Borough Council has refused to release details of the legal arrangement. The Marquess had previously been involved with the controversial attempted sale of the Seuso Treasure.

In June 2014, the council was asked by a local newspaper: "Are you prepared to show the documents and agreements made with the Marquess of Northampton to any member of the public who asks to see them? If not, why not?" and replied "The details of the agreement are confidential between Lord Northampton and the borough council, but we can confirm that 55% of the sale will go to the council and 45% will go to Lord Northampton." The council also stated "The council’s ownership of Sekhemka has been confirmed following advice from lawyers, who are satisfied we have legal right to proceed with the sale. We do not have any deed specifically relating to Sekhemka." After the sale of the statue The Save Sekhemka Action Group questioned why the Marquess of Northampton would be receiving over £5 million from the proceeds since, according to Northampton Borough Council, the council owned the statue.

=== Protests ===
The Egyptian Ministry of Antiquities asked the Egyptian Embassy in London to take all legal procedures to stop the sale of the statue. Minister Mamdouh Al-Damati condemned the sale as being incompatible with the values and role of museums worldwide which should spread culture rather than seeking to earn money. He also called on the International Council of Museums (ICOM) to stop the sale on ethical grounds. The Museum Association for the United Kingdom warned the council that it would review Northampton's membership if it went ahead with the sale. The Arts Council of England said the sale could jeopardise the accreditation status of Northampton Museums and that could in future limit the museum's ability to obtain grant funding. Archaeologist Andy Brockman, who took part in the Save Sekhemka campaign said the sale would "bring Northampton Council into disrepute" and that the sale was "opposed by museum and archaeological professionals who wish to make sure no part of Egypt's cultural history is sold off."

The sale of artefacts to pay institutional expenses is strictly against the ethical codes of national and international heritage bodies... CIPEG is concerned that, as a consequence, a well-known masterpiece of Egyptian art may disappear into a private collection, making it inaccessible to the general public, students, and scholars. CIPEG urges the Northampton Borough Council to abandon the sale of the statue of Sekhemka, and thereby to set an example of ethical behaviour on the part of a public institution which acts as custodian for objects of world cultural importance.

ICOM CIPEG also expressed concern that the sale might encourage illegal excavation and plundering of Ancient Egyptian antiquities.

=== "The Curse of Sekhemka" ===
In July 2013, a local politician who opposed the sale of the statue commented: "I've read there is a curse attached to Sekhemka and if it should fall on anyone, it should fall on this administration for not having the courage to change their minds." The day before the sale was scheduled to take place the estate office of the Marquess of Northampton's Castle Ashby caught fire leading to stories about the "Curse Of Sekhemka". Fire crews from three counties fought the blaze.

=== Auction ===
Christie's sold the Sekhemka statue for £15.76M at an auction on 10 July 2014 to an anonymous buyer. The auction was briefly halted by a protester who called out that "no-one should bid or buy it...stolen property," while a small, vocal group of Egyptian protesters demonstrated outside. The final auction price was almost £10 m more than Christie's guide price. The price obtained broke the existing world record for an Ancient Egyptian artwork sold at auction.

=== Reaction to sale ===
The Save Sekhemka Action group described the sale as a "day of shame for Northampton", and said that selling the statue had been "the decision of one man [council leader David Mackintosh], taken against all professional advice locally, nationally and internationally" The sale was described by the Egyptian Embassy as a "shameful and unethical act". Scott Furlong, of Arts Council England, said: "It is very disappointing that the local authority committed to the sale and entered into an agreement with an auction house before our discussions with them were concluded." Northampton council leader David Mackintosh said the council's share of the proceeds would be used to develop the existing museum. The writer Alan Moore also condemned the council's decision to sell the statue. The Art Fund commented the day after the sale:

The Art Fund supports careful collections management, which includes responsible deaccessioning, ideally with an item being freely transferred to another body so it can remain on public display. However, in line with the Museum Association’s Code of Ethics for museums, we remain strongly opposed to deaccessioning any item for financial reasons except in exceptional circumstances, where the funds will directly benefit the museum collection and only after all other options have been explored. This is not the case with the sale of Sekhemka and as such, having gone against the sector's ethical guidance, it risks being stripped of its accredited status. This is therefore a financially as well as morally harmful decision for Northampton Borough Council to take. Not only will they receive only 55% of the final hammer price of £15.8m, but Northampton Museum and Art Gallery will no longer be eligible to apply to us and other major funders for funding for acquisitions, capital projects (including the planned £14m extension), and artistic or educational programming.

The Arts Council announced that Northampton Museums' accreditation would be reviewed on 24 July 2014:

We are saddened to hear that Northampton Borough Council has now sold Sekhemka, the Egyptian statue, from its public museum collection. It is very disappointing that the local authority committed to the sale and entered into an agreement with an auction house before our discussions with them were concluded...Those who choose to approach the sale of collections cynically or with little regard for the sectoral standards or their long-term responsibilities will only further alienate both key funders and the public who put their trust in them to care for our shared inheritance. It is of great importance that the public retain trust in museums to look after the collections held in their name. We are concerned that this trust may be undermined if disposals from public collections are seen to be driven by financial considerations.

=== Museum loses accreditation ===
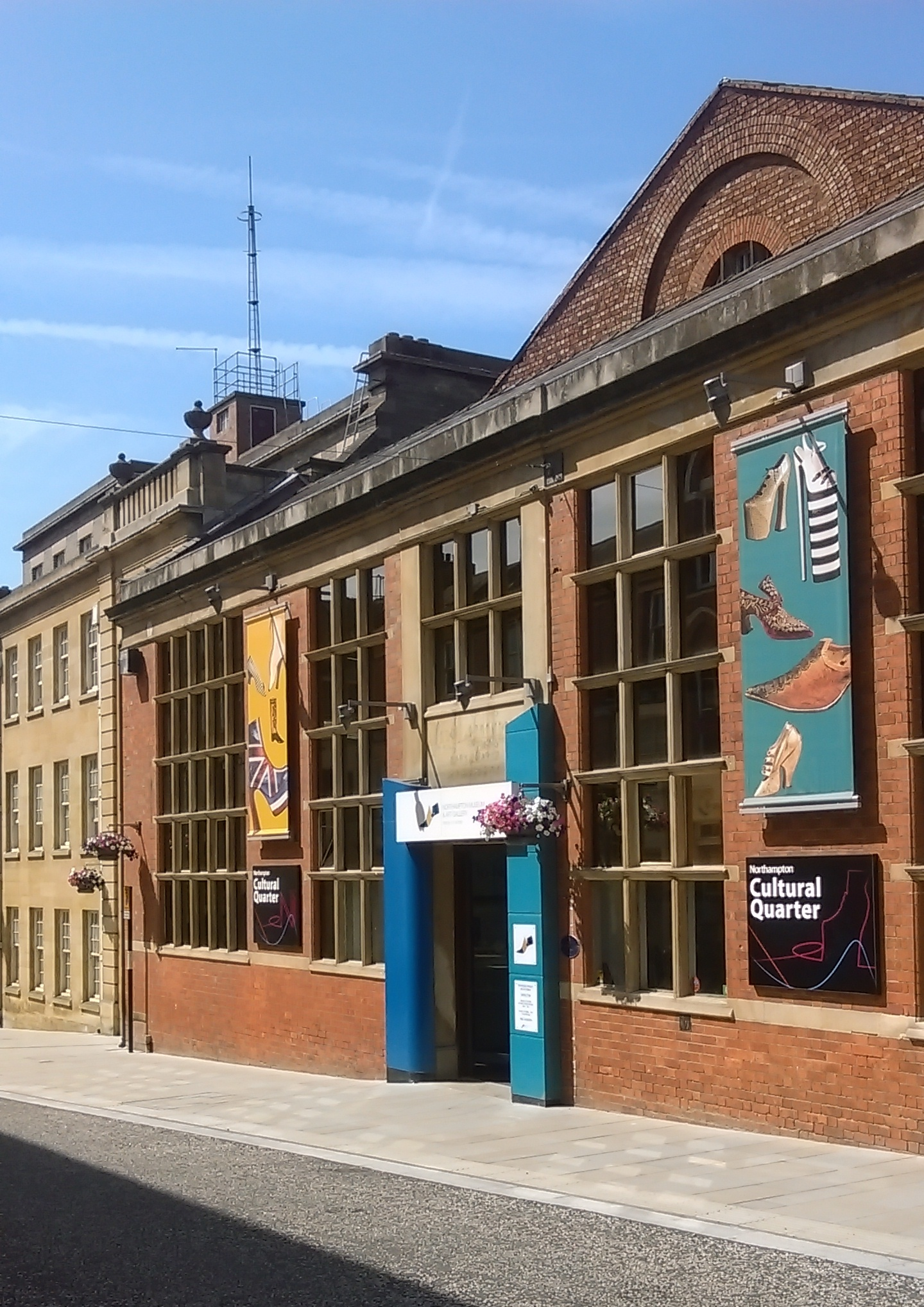
Northampton Museum

On 1 August 2014, Northampton Museums had their accreditation removed by the Arts Council England, who ruled that the sale broke the required standards for museums managing their collections, rendering the museums ineligible for funding from a range of arts grants and funding bodies. The museums are excluded from future participation until at least August 2019. Scott Furlong of the Arts Council commented: "It is always hugely regrettable when we have to exclude a museum from the Accreditation Scheme. However, it is equally important that we are robust in upholding the standards and principles which underpin the scheme and are shared by the vast majority of museums." The leader of Northampton borough council, David Mackintosh said the Arts Council decision was "disappointing" and "puzzling", and stated "We are possibly one of the only local authorities in the country with plans for a multimillion pound investment in their museum service."

The Save Sekhemka Action Group commented "This is indeed a black and shameful day for Northampton's Culture and Heritage" and that "it will mean the certain decline of both the Central and Abington Museum since the loss of this statue stops the Museum Service being eligible for outside grants from the Lottery, Arts Council England and other art/cultural grant giving bodies." They said that the monetary loss through loss of accreditation is likely to be in excess of the £8m gross the council received from the sale of the statue.

In November 2014, the Borough Council's bid for a Heritage Lottery Fund grant of £240,400 was rejected because the applicant no longer had Arts Council accreditation. The funding was being sought for an exhibition of designer shoes dating from the 19th century to the present. The council said it was "disappointed". The Museums Association decided to ban the council from membership for five years.

=== Friends organisation disbands ===
In September 2014, the Friends of Northampton Museums and Art Gallery decided to disband after 55 years' financial and practical service to the town. The sale of the statue was partly to blame for this; the group was against the sale, though some felt it did not fall within the group's functions.

=== Export licence refused ===
On 30 March 2015, British culture minister Ed Vaizey placed a four-month temporary export ban on the statue, which had been sold to an unidentified overseas buyer, rumoured to be American. The Arts Council said there was a chance the statue could be sold to a UK buyer if "a serious intention to raise funds to purchase the statue is made at the recommended price of £15,732,600 plus VAT."

On 2 October 2015, Vaizey extended the export ban until 29 March 2016, after hearing of a serious bid to raise funds to save the statue for the UK. However, no-one made a counter-offer during this extension and in April 2016 the ban was lifted. The current whereabouts of the statue is unknown.

=== Group claims sale may have been illegal ===
On 21 April 2015 the Save Sekhemka Action Group said that they think that a condition of the original Deed of Gift was that the statue should never be sold, making the auction illegal. The group said that they had no intention of trying to buy the statue back but suggest that it is put on display at a major museum. It is also challenging the £6m donation from the sale proceeds to the Marquess of Northampton's family. It will also examine borough council records to determine "the legal and financial arrangements reached with the Marquis of Northampton".

The BBC reported in October 2016 that the statue now is thought to have been exported to the United States. BBC news revealed how the council, which made £8m from the sale, had been warned by lawyers not to sell it for "financial motives". The council said it sold the figurine to help fund a £14m extension to its museum and art gallery.
