= David van der Kellen Sr. =

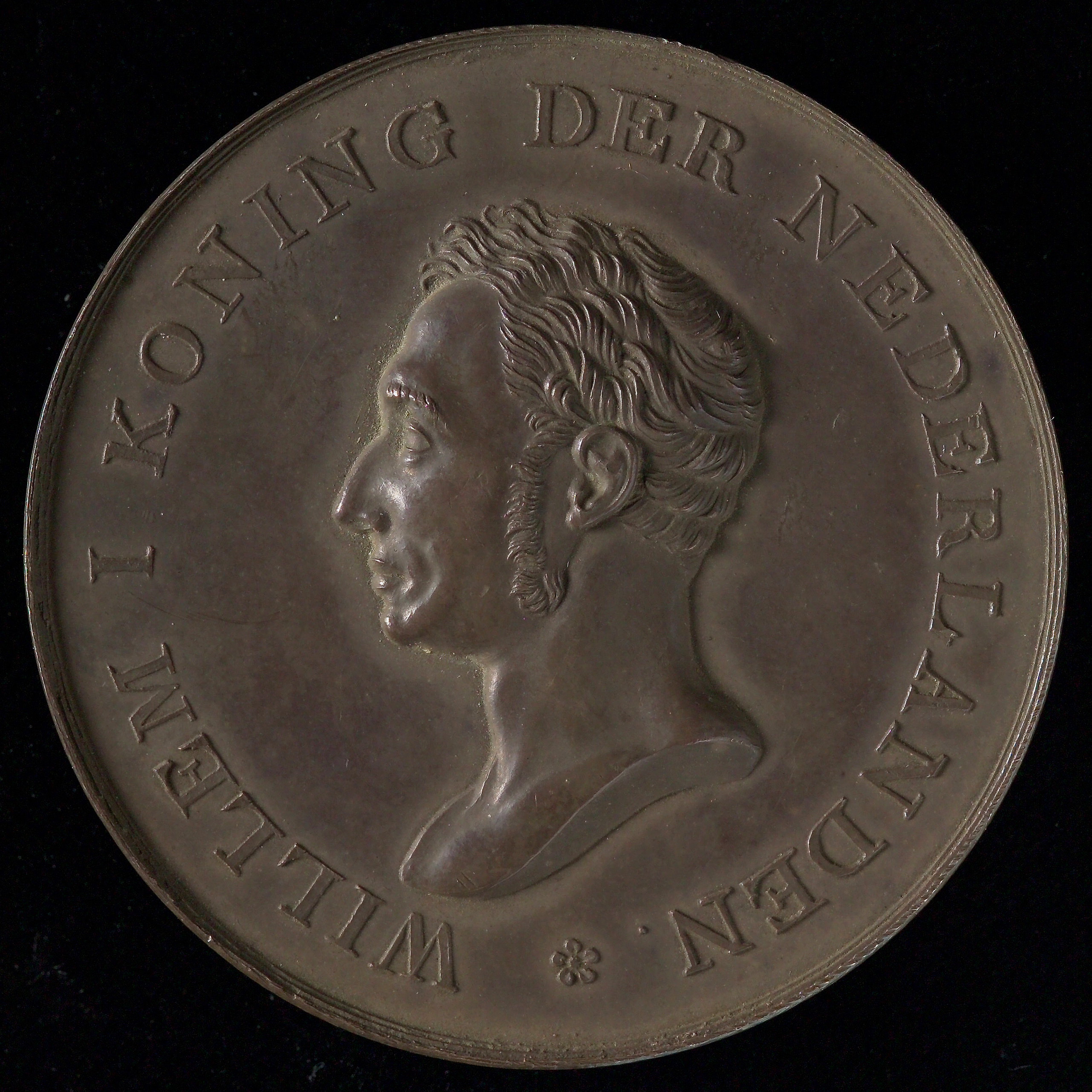
Commemorative coin on the occasion of the opening of the Royal Academy of Arts / Rijksakademie, Amsterdam 1820

David van der Kellen Sr. (1764, Velsen – 1825, Utrecht), was a 19th-century engraver and medallist from the Netherlands.

== Biography ==
According to van der Aa, he lost both parents at a young age and was brought up in the Lutheran orphanage in Haarlem. He chose to become a goldsmith and learned drawing, sculpting, and engraving, whereupon he went to work in Amsterdam for Holtzhey. According to the RKD he was a pupil of Johann Georg Holtzhey in Amsterdam. He made medals for special occasions as well as official coins and became the mint master for the city of Utrecht. He was the father and teacher of David Jr. who succeeded him.
