= Dress history =

Study of history via clothing and textiles

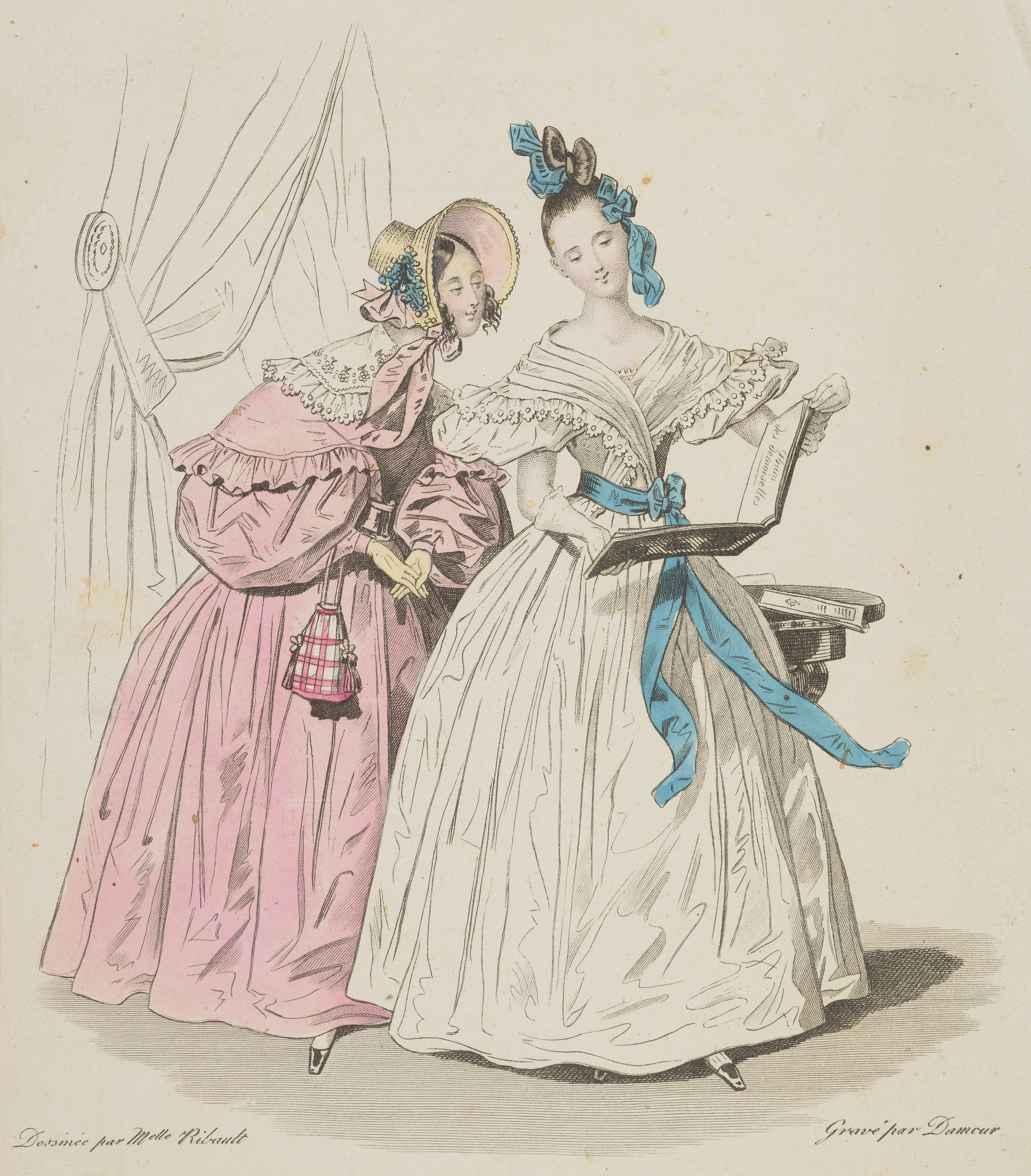
Fashion plate, 1835. Journal des demoiselles

Dress history is a branch in the study of history which uses clothing and textiles to understand the past. Through analyzing modes of dress, different garment types, textiles, and accessories of a certain time in history, a dress historian may research and identify the social, cultural, economic, technological, and political contexts that influence such phenomena and experiences of living during the period under investigation.

Methods of research used in dress history are wide ranging, with dress history scholars often approaching analysis from a variety of perspectives and topic interests, which may place focus on, for example, manufacture, retail, and/or consumption of clothing, modes of dress, means of sartorial expression, dress traditions, labor, trade, and capital, geography, or chronology.

== Dress historical research ==
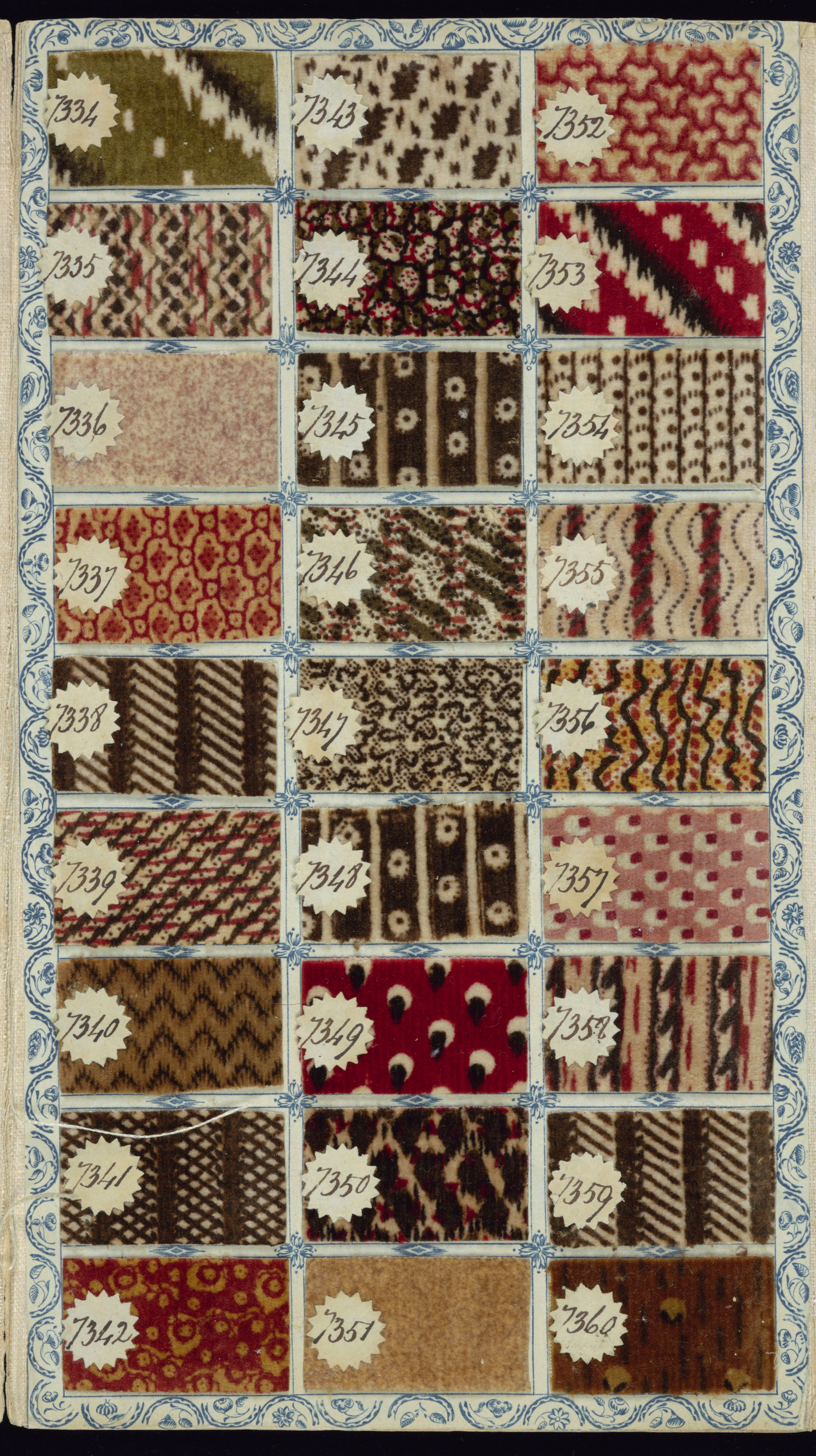
Salesman's Sample Book (England), 1784. Cooper Hewitt, Smithsonian Design Museum

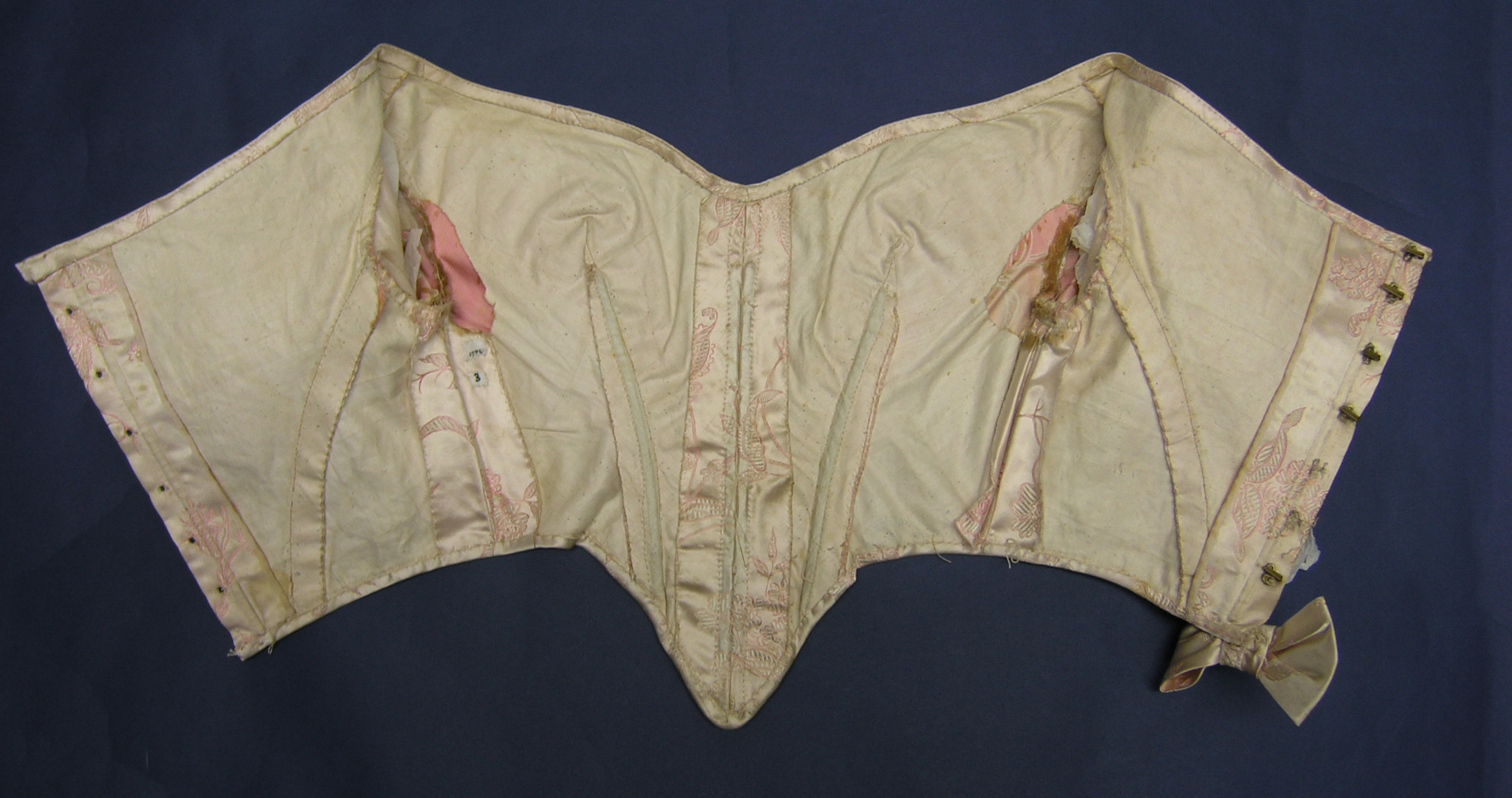
Ball dress, dismantled, c. 1840, Auckland Museum

Dress history, as a specialized subject in historical research, is the study of manners of dress through time. This encompasses study centered in contextual historical grounding, which can include or stem from types or styles of clothing distinctive of a certain period in history, change in modes of sartorial expression, or the study of a specific garment or garment type. Through dress historical analysis of the visual and symbolic attributes of clothing, social customs of a particular time period and place can be better understood.

Approaches to dress historical research employ wide-ranging, cross-disciplinary academic methods of analysis. Research may be informed by anthropology, sociology, gender studies, economic, design, and political histories, may be qualitative and/or quantitative in nature, and may also employ object-based research and material culture analysis.

By using an inclusive and expansive range of different approaches and drawing on an extensive variety of sources, the subject of dress history highlights how the parameters within which dress historians conduct their research is less bound by traditional forms of recognized historical practice.

Research may be informed by a range of different types of primary sources, including contemporary surviving garments, written material, working documents (such as textile swatch books or account ledgers), popular press publications (such as magazines and newspapers), painting, and photographs. Many dress historians have worked from these documentary sources rather than examining clothing itself; the process of detailed examination of a piece of clothing to describe and interpret its function, construction, and condition has only been introduced relatively recently.

Within the subject specialism of dress history, dress historians often use visual examination as a center from which to build understanding around dress, including analysis of illustrative images (such as paintings, fashion plates and caricatures), surviving objects (including clothing, accessories, and textiles), and textual analysis (of contemporary documentary sources).

Through studying a wide range of different primary source material, dress historical approaches may be used to interpret dress, clothing, and fashion within historical contexts. A dress historian uses these methods (both theoretical and object-based approaches) as a way of understanding the past; interpreting forms of dressing of a certain period may facilitate comprehension of the social, political, economic, and cultural contexts of a period of time and a particular place.

== See also ==
- List of individual dresses
- The Costume Society
