= Janet Arnold =

British costume historian

- Born: 6 October 1932; Bristol
- Died: 2 November 1998 (aged 66); London
- Known for: Clothing historian and author
- Notable work: Patterns of Fashion
- Parents: Frederick Charles Arnold (father); Adeline Arnold (mother)

Janet Arnold (6 October 1932 – 2 November 1998) was a British clothing historian, costume designer, teacher, conservator, and author. She is best known for her series of works called Patterns of Fashion, which included accurate scale sewing patterns, used by museums and theatres alike. She went on to write A Handbook of Costume, a book on the primary sources on costume study, and Queen Elizabeth's Wardrobe Unlock'd, as well as many other books.

Arnold was awarded the inaugural Sam Wanamaker Award in 1998. After her death, the Society of Antiquaries of London who had previously made her a fellow, created a grant in her name, as did The Costume Society, which she helped to found.

== Biography ==
Janet Arnold was born at Duncan House, Clifton Down Road in Bristol on 6 October 1932. Her father, Frederick Charles Arnold was an ironmonger, whilst her mother, Adeline Arnold, was a nurse. She was educated at The Red Maids' School and took a keen interest in clothes based on the school's uniform for orphans. Arnold went to study at West of England College of Art, where she achieved a National Diploma, before obtaining her art teacher's diploma from Bristol University in 1954.

Arnold took on the role of lecturer at Hammersmith Day College in 1955 and remained there until 1962 when she moved to a senior lecturer role at Avery Hill College of Education, where she remained until 1970. In 1971, she took on a part-time role of research lecturer at West Surrey School of Art and Design. Arnold went on to start working with the department of drama and theatre studies at Royal Holloway College in 1978.

== Works ==
Arnold's best known work was writing the series of books, including Patterns of Fashion, vol. 1: 1660–1860 and Patterns of Fashion, vol. 2: 1860–1940. The volumes include a large number of sewing patterns showing the change in fashion across the period, with crucial details of the construction, accurately drawn to scale. These books are regarded highly by museums, theatres, reenactment groups and students. She went on to write A Handbook of Costume in 1973, a comprehensive guide to research sources in the topic of costume study.

She helped ensure the accuracy of costumes for film and television, as well as ensure that museums had accurate replicas of outfits. During the late 1970s and throughout the 1980s, Arnold worked on her opus Queen Elizabeth's Wardrobe Unlock'd.

== Selected bibliography ==
- 1964: Patterns of Fashion 1 (cut and construction of women's clothing, 1660–1860), Wace 1964, Macmillan 1972. Revised metric edition, Drama Books 1977. ISBN 0-89676-026-X.
- 1966: Patterns of Fashion 2: Englishwomen's dresses and their construction c. 1860–1940, Wace 1966, Macmillan 1972. Revised metric edition, Drama Books 1977. ISBN 0-89676-027-8
- 1970: Perukes and Periwigs, Her Majesty's Stationery Office, 1970. A booklet on the development of wig styles in paintings at the National Portrait Gallery, London.
- 1973: A Handbook of Costume, Macmillan 1973. Reprinted 1978. A guide to the primary sources for costume study.
- 1980: Lost from Her Majesty's Back, the Costume Society, 1980. Items of clothing and jewels lost or given away by Elizabeth I between 1561 and 1583, entered in one of the day books kept for the records of the Wardrobe of Robes.
- 1985: Patterns of Fashion: the cut and construction of clothes for men and women 1560–1620, Macmillan 1985. Revised edition 1986. ISBN 0-89676-083-9
- 1988: Queen Elizabeth's Wardrobe Unlock'd, W. S. Maney and Son Ltd, Leeds, 1988. ISBN 0-901286-20-6 A study of the clothing of Queen Elizabeth I, based on portraits, surviving inventories of the Wardrobe of Robes, and other original documents.
- 2008: Patterns of Fashion 4: the cut and construction of linen shirts, smocks, neckwear, headwear and accessories for men and women c. 1540–1660, London, Macmillan, November 2008, ISBN 978-0-333-57082-1

=== Posthumous publications ===
- 2018: Arnold, Janet; Tiramani, Jenny; Costigliolo, Luca; Passot, Sebastien; Lucas, Armelle; Pietsch, Johannes: Patterns of fashion 5 : the content, cut, construction and context of bodies, stays, hoops and rumps c. 1595-1795 (1st ed.). London: The School of Historical Dress. ISBN 978-0-9931744-2-1 OCLC 1066698686.
- 2022: Arnold, Janet; Passot, Sébastien; Thornton, Claire; Tiramani, Jenny: Patterns of fashion 6, The content, cut, construction and context of women's European dress c. 1695-1795. London: The School of Historical Dress. ISBN 978-0-9931744-5-2 OCLC 1330885967.

== Legacy ==
In the 1980s, Arnold was nominated first as honorary research associate and then honorary research fellow at Royal Holloway College. In 1981, she became a fellow of the Society of Antiquaries of London. She was presented the inaugural Sam Wanamaker Award in July 1998 with Mark Rylance. Arnold died of lymphoma at her home in London on 2 November 1998; she had been working on costumes for Theatre Royal, Bristol and Mermaid Theatre just two days earlier.

The Society of Antiquaries of London set up a research grant in her honour, which makes annual grants to further in-depth study of the history of dress and the materials from which it is made. The Costume Society, which Arnold helped to found, gives out an annual award of £500 in her memory to a student who has produced a reconstructed garment from one of her books.

In May 2020, the rights to the out-of-print ''Patterns of Fashions 1-4'' books reverted from Macmillan Publishing to The School of Historical Dress. The School is republishing the collected works as well as previously planned but incomplete volumes.
