= List of electoral wards in Derbyshire =

This is a list of electoral divisions and wards in the ceremonial county of Derbyshire in the East Midlands. All changes since the re-organisation of local government following the passing of the Local Government Act 1972 are shown. The number of councillors elected for each electoral division or ward is shown in brackets.

== County council ==
=== Derbyshire ===
Electoral Divisions from 1 April 1974 (first election 12 April 1973) to 7 May 1981:

1. Alfreton No. 1 (1)
2. Alfreton No. 2 (1)
3. Ashbourne & Hartington (1)
4. Bakewell (1)
5. Bakewell Rural No. 1 (1)
6. Bakewell Rural No. 2 (1)
7. Belper No. 1 (1)
8. Belper No. 2 (1)
9. Belper Rural No. 1 (1)
10. Belper Rural No. 2 (1)
11. Belper Rural No. 3 (1)
12. Blackwell No. 1 (1)
13. Blackwell No. 2 (1)
14. Blackwell No. 3 (1)
15. Blackwell No. 4 (1)
16. Bolsover (1)
17. Buxton North (1)
18. Buxton South (1)
19. Chapel-en-le-Frith No. 1 (1)
20. Chapel-en-le-Frith No. 2 (1)
21. Chesterfield No. 1 (1)
22. Chesterfield No. 2 (2)
23. Chesterfield No. 3 (1)
24. Chesterfield No. 4 (2)
25. Chesterfield No. 5 (1)
26. Chesterfield No. 6 (1)
27. Chesterfield Rural No. 1 (1)
28. Chesterfield Rural No. 2 (1)
29. Chesterfield Rural No. 3 (1)
30. Chesterfield Rural No. 4 (1)
31. Chesterfield Rural No. 5 (1)
32. Chesterfield Rural No. 6 (1)
33. Chesterfield Rural No. 7 (1)
34. Clay Cross (1)
35. Clowne (1)
36. Derby Abbey (2)
37. Derby Allestree (2)
38. Derby Alvaston (1)
39. Derby Arboretum (1)
40. Derby Babington (2)
41. Derby Breadsall (1)
42. Derby Chaddesden (1)
43. Derby Chellaston (2)
44. Derby Darley (1)
45. Derby Derwent (1)
46. Derby Friar Gate (2)
47. Derby Litchurch (1)
48. Derby Littleover (1)
49. Derby Mickleover (2)
50. Derby Normanton (1)
51. Derby Osmaston (1)
52. Derby Pear Tree (1)
53. Derby Spondon (1)
54. Dronfield (2)
55. Elmton & Whitwell (1)
56. Glossop No. 1 (1)
57. Glossop No. 2 (1)
58. Heanor No. 1 (1)
59. Heanor No. 2 (1)
60. Heanor No. 3 (1)
61. Ilkeston No. 1 (1)
62. Ilkeston No. 2 (1)
63. Ilkeston No. 3 (1)
64. Ilkeston No. 4 (1)
65. Long Eaton No. 1 (2)
66. Long Eaton No. 2 (1)
67. Long Eaton No. 3 (1)
68. Matlock No. 1 (1)
69. Matlock No. 2 (1)
70. New Mills No. 1 (1)
71. New Mills No. 2 (1)
72. Repton No. 1 (1)
73. Repton No. 2 (1)
74. Repton No. 3 (1)
75. Ripley No. 1 (1)
76. Ripley No. 2 (1)
77. South East Derbyshire No. 1 (1)
78. South East Derbyshire No. 2 (1)
79. South East Derbyshire No. 3 (1)
80. South East Derbyshire No. 4 (1)
81. Staveley East (1)
82. Staveley West (1)
83. Sudbury (1)
84. Swadlincote No. 1 (1)
85. Swadlincote No. 2 (1)
86. Swadlincote No. 3 (1)
87. Whaley Bridge (1)
88. Wirksworth (1)

Electoral Divisions from 7 May 1981 to 5 May 2005:

1. Abbey (1); electoral division abolished in 1997
2. Alfreton (1)
3. Allestree (1); electoral division abolished in 1997
4. Alport (1)
5. Alvaston (1); electoral division abolished in 1997
6. Ashbourne (1)
7. Babington (1); electoral division abolished in 1997
8. Bakewell (1)
9. Barlborough & Clowne (1)
10. Belper (1)
11. Blagreaves (1); electoral division abolished in 1997
12. Bolsover (1)
13. Boulton (1); electoral division abolished in 1997
14. Brackenfield (1)
15. Breadsall (1); electoral division abolished in 1997
16. Brimington (1)
17. Buxton North (1)
18. Buxton South (1)
19. Chaddesden (1); electoral division abolished in 1997
20. Chapel (1)
21. Chellaston (1); electoral division abolished in 1997
22. Chesterfield North (1)
23. Clay Cross (1)
24. Cotmanhay (1)
25. Darley (1); electoral division abolished in 1997
26. Darley Dale (1)
27. Derwent (1); electoral division abolished in 1997
28. Draycott (1)
29. Dronfield North (1)
30. Dronfield South (1)
31. Duffield (1)
32. Eckington (1)
33. Elmton (1)
34. Etwall (1)
35. Glossop East (1)
36. Glossop South (1)
37. Glossop West (1)
38. Hasland & St Leonards (1)
39. Heage (1)
40. Heanor (1)
41. Holmebrook & Rother (1)
42. Holymoor & Wingerworth (1)
43. Horsley (1)
44. Ilkeston (1)
45. Killamarsh (1)
46. Kingsway (1); electoral division abolished in 1997
47. Kirk Hallam (1)
48. Linton (1)
49. Litchurch (1); electoral division abolished in 1997
50. Littleover (1); electoral division abolished in 1997
51. Long Eaton (1)
52. Loscoe (1)
53. Mackworth (1); electoral division abolished in 1997
54. Matlock (1)
55. Melbourne (1)
56. Mickleover (1); electoral division abolished in 1997
57. Moor & St Helens (1)
58. New Mills (1)
59. Newbold & Brockwell (1)
60. Newhall (1)
61. Normanton (1); electoral division abolished in 1997
62. North Wingfield (1)
63. Osmaston (1); electoral division abolished in 1997
64. Petersham (1)
65. Repton (1)
66. Ripley (1)
67. Sandiacre (1)
68. Sawley (1)
69. Scarcliffe (1)
70. Sheepbridge (1)
71. Shirebrook (1)
72. Sinfin (1); electoral division abolished in 1997
73. Somercotes (1)
74. South Normanton (1)
75. Spondon (1); electoral division abolished in 1997
76. Staveley (1)
77. Sutton (1)
78. Swadlincote (1)
79. Tibshelf (1)
80. Tideswell (1)
81. Walton & West (1)
82. West Hallam (1)
83. Whaley Bridge (1)
84. Wirksworth (1)

Electoral Divisions from 5 May 2005 to 2 May 2013:

1. Alfreton (1)
2. Alport & Derwent (1)
3. Ashbourne (1)
4. Ashgate (1)
5. Aston & Melbourne (1)
6. Bakewell (1)
7. Barlborough & Clowne (1)
8. Belper (1)
9. Birdholme (1)
10. Bolsover North West, Elmton & Whitwell (1)
11. Bolsover South West & Scarcliffe (1)
12. Breadsall & West Hallam (1)
13. Breaston (1)
14. Brimington (1)
15. Buxton North & East (1)
16. Buxton West (1)
17. Chapel & Hope Valley (1)
18. Clay Cross (1)
19. Cotmanhay (1)
20. Derwent Valley (1)
21. Dovedale (1)
22. Dronfield North (1)
23. Dronfield South (1)
24. Duffield & Belper South (1)
25. Eckington (1)
26. Etherow (1)
27. Glossop North & Rural (1)
28. Glossop South (1)
29. Greater Heanor (1)
30. Hatton & Hilton (1)
31. Heage (1)
32. Heanor Central (1)
33. Hipper (1)
34. Holymoorside & Wingerworth (1)
35. Horsley (1)
36. Ilkeston (1)
37. Killamarsh (1)
38. Kirk Hallam (1)
39. Linton & Church Gresley (1)
40. Long Eaton (1)
41. Matlock (1)
42. Midway & Hartshorne (1)
43. New Mills (1)
44. Newbold (1)
45. Newhall & Seales (1)
46. North Wingfield & Tupton (1)
47. Petersham (1)
48. Pinxton & South Normanton West (1)
49. Repton & Willington (1)
50. Ripley (1)
51. Sandiacre (1)
52. Sawley (1)
53. Shirebrook & Pleasley (1)
54. Somercotes (1)
55. South Normanton East & Tibshelf (1)
56. Spire (1)
57. St Mary's (1)
58. Staveley North & Whittington (1)
59. Staveley South (1)
60. Stonebroom & Pilsley (1)
61. Sutton (1)
62. Swadlincote Central & Woodville (1)
63. Whaley Bridge & Blackbrook (1)
64. Wirksworth (1)

Electoral Divisions from 2 May 2013 to 1 May 2025:

1. Alfreton & Somercotes (2)
2. Alport & Derwent (1)
3. Ashbourne (1)
4. Aston (1)
5. Bakewell (1)
6. Barlborough & Clowne (1)
7. Belper (1)
8. Birdholme (1)
9. Bolsover North (1)
10. Bolsover South (1)
11. Boythorpe & Brampton South (1)
12. Breadsall & West Hallam (1)
13. Breaston (1)
14. Brimington (1)
15. Buxton North & East (1)
16. Buxton West (1)
17. Chapel & Hope Valley (1)
18. Clay Cross North (1)
19. Clay Cross South (1)
20. Derwent Valley (1)
21. Dovedale (1)
22. Dronfield East (1)
23. Dronfield West & Walton (1)
24. Duffield & Belper South (1)
25. Eckington & Killamarsh (2)
26. Etherow (1)
27. Etwall & Repton (1)
28. Glossop & Charlesworth (2)
29. Greater Heanor (1)
30. Heanor Central (1)
31. Hilton (1)
32. Horsley (1)
33. Ilkeston East (1)
34. Ilkeston South (1)
35. Ilkeston West (1)
36. Linton (1)
37. Long Eaton (1)
38. Loundsley Green & Newbold (1)
39. Matlock (1)
40. Melbourne (1)
41. New Mills (1)
42. Petersham (1)
43. Ripley East & Codnor (1)
44. Ripley West & Heage (1)
45. Sandiacre (1)
46. Sawley (1)
47. Shirebrook & Pleasley (1)
48. South Normanton & Pinxton (1)
49. Spire (1)
50. St Mary’s (1)
51. Staveley (1)
52. Staveley North & Whittington (1)
53. Sutton (1)
54. Swadlincote Central (1)
55. Swadlincote North (1)
56. Swadlincote South (1)
57. Tibshelf (1)
58. Walton & West (1)
59. Whaley Bridge (1)
60. Wingerworth & Shirland (1)
61. Wirksworth (1)

Electoral Divisions from 1 May 2025 to present:

1. Alfreton & Somercotes (1)
2. Alport & Duffield (1)
3. Ashbourne South (1)
4. Aston (1)
5. Bakewell (1)
6. Barlborough & Clowne (1)
7. Bolsover (1)
8. Breadsall & West Hallam (1)
9. Breaston (1)
10. Brimington (1)
11. Buxton North & East (1)
12. Buxton South & West (1)
13. Chapel & Hope Valley (1)
14. Clay Cross & Tupton (1)
15. Codnor, Aldercar, Langley Mill & Loscoe (1)
16. Derwent Valley (1)
17. Dovedale & Ashbourne North (1)
18. Dronfield & Unstone (1)
19. Dronfield Woodhouse & Walton (1)
20. Dunston (1)
21. Eckington & Coal Aston (1)
22. Elmton with Creswell & Whitwell (1)
23. Etherow (1)
24. Etwall & Findern (1)
25. Glossop North (1)
26. Glossop South (1)
27. Hardwick (1)
28. Hasland & Rother (1)
29. Heanor (1)
30. Horsley (1)
31. Hilton (1)
32. Ilkeston Central (1)
33. Ilkeston North (1)
34. Ilkeston South & Kirk Hallam (1)
35. Killamarsh & Renishaw (1)
36. Linacre & Loundsley Green (1)
37. Linton (1)
38. Long Eaton North (1)
39. Long Eaton South (1)
40. Matlock (1)
41. Melbourne & Woodville (1)
42. New Mills & Hayfield (1)
43. North Belper (1)
44. North Wingfield, Pilsley & Morton (1)
45. Repton & Stenson (1)
46. Ripley East (1)
47. Ripley West & Crich (1)
48. Sandiacre (1)
49. Sawley (1)
50. Shirebrook & Pleasley (1)
51. Shirland & Wingerworth South (1)
52. South Belper & Holbrook (1)
53. South Normanton & Pinxton (1)
54. Spire (1)
55. Staveley (1)
56. Staveley North & Whittington (1)
57. Sutton (1)
58. Swadlincote East (1)
59. Swadlincote South (1)
60. Swadlincote West (1)
61. Swanwick & Riddings (1)
62. Walton, Brampton & Boythorpe (1)
63. Whaley Bridge (1)
64. Wirksworth (1)

== Unitary authority council ==
=== Derby ===
Wards from 1 April 1974 (first election 7 June 1973) to 3 May 1979:

1. Abbey (3)
2. Allestree (3)
3. Alvaston (3)
4. Arboretum (3)
5. Babington (3)
6. Breadsall (3)
7. Chaddesden (3)
8. Chellaston (3)
9. Darley (3)
10. Derwent (3)
11. Friar Gate (3)
12. Litchurch (3)
13. Littleover (3)
14. Mickleover (3)
15. Normanton (3)
16. Osmaston (3)
17. Pear Tree (3)
18. Spondon (3)

Wards from 3 May 1979 to 2 May 2002:

1. Abbey (3)
2. Allestree (2)
3. Alvaston (2)
4. Babington (3)
5. Blagreaves (2)
6. Boulton (2)
7. Breadsall (2)
8. Chaddesden (2)
9. Chellaston (2)
10. Darley (3)
11. Derwent (2)
12. Kingsway (2)
13. Litchurch (2)
14. Littleover (2)
15. Mackworth (2)
16. Mickleover (2)
17. Normanton (2)
18. Osmaston (2)
19. Sinfin (2)
20. Spondon (3)

Wards from 2 May 2002 to 4 May 2023:

1. Abbey (3)
2. Allestree (3)
3. Alvaston (3)
4. Arboretum (3)
5. Blagreaves (3)
6. Boulton (3)
7. Chaddesden (3)
8. Chellaston (3)
9. Darley (3)
10. Derwent (3)
11. Littleover (3)
12. Mackworth (3)
13. Mickleover (3)
14. Normanton (3)
15. Oakwood (3)
16. Sinfin (3)
17. Spondon (3)

Wards from 4 May 2023 to present:

1. Abbey (3)
2. Allestree (3)
3. Alvaston North (3)
4. Alvaston South (3)
5. Arboretum (3)
6. Blagreaves (3)
7. Chaddesden East (2)
8. Chaddesden North (2)
9. Chaddesden West (2)
10. Chellaston & Shelton Lock (3)
11. Darley (3)
12. Littleover (3)
13. Mackworth & New Zealand (3)
14. Mickleover (3)
15. Normanton (3)
16. Oakwood (3)
17. Sinfin & Osmaston (3)
18. Spondon (3)

== District councils ==
=== Amber Valley ===
Wards from 1 April 1974 (first election 7 June 1973) to 3 May 1979:

1. No. 1 (Alfreton) (4)
2. No. 2 (Somercotes) (3)
3. No. 3 (Swanwick) (2)
4. No. 4 (Riddings & Ironville) (3)
5. No. 5 (Belper: Central) (2)
6. No. 6 (Belper: East) (3)
7. No. 7 (Belper: Milford) (1)
8. No. 8 (Belper: North) (2)
9. No. 9 (Belper: South) (2)
10. No. 10 (Heanor: North & West) (4)
11. No. 11 (Heanor: Central Southwest & West Central (5)
12. No. 12 (Heanor: East & South) (5)
13. No. 13 (Ripley: West) (2)
14. No. 14 (Ripley: Ambergate & Heage) (3)
15. No. 15 (Ripley: Butterley & East) (2)
16. No. 16 (Ripley: Marehay & Waingroves) (3)
17. No. 17 (Crich) (2)
18. No. 19 (Holbrook) (1)
19. No. 21 (Denby) (1)
20. No. 22 (Smalley) (1)
21. No. 23 (South Wingfield) (1)
22. No. 24 (Dethick Lea & Holloway) (1)
23. No. 25 (Turnditch & Windley) (1)
24. No. 26 (Quarndon) (1)
25. No. 27 (Horsley Woodhouse) (1)
26. No. 28 (Shipley) (1)
27. Duffield (2)
28. Kilburn (1)

Wards from 3 May 1979 to 4 May 2000:

1. Alfreton East (2)
2. Alfreton West (2)
3. Alport (1)
4. Belper East (3)
5. Belper North (2)
6. Belper South (2)
7. Codnor (1)
8. Crich (1)
9. Denby & Horsley Woodhouse (1)
10. Duffield (2)
11. Heage & Ambergate (2)
12. Heanor & Loscoe (2)
13. Heanor East (2)
14. Heanor West (2)
15. Holbrook & Horsley (1)
16. Ironville & Riddings (2)
17. Kilburn (1)
18. Langley Mill & Aldercar (2)
19. Ripley (3)
20. Ripley & Marehay (2)
21. Shipley Park (1)
22. Somercotes (2)
23. South West Parishes (1)
24. Swanwick (2)
25. Wingfield (1)

Wards from 4 May 2000 to 4 May 2023:

1. Alfreton (3)
2. Alport (1)
3. Belper Central (2)
4. Belper East (2)
5. Belper North (2)
6. Belper South (2)
7. Codnor & Waingroves (2)
8. Crich (1)
9. Duffield (2)
10. Heage & Ambergate (2)
11. Heanor East (2)
12. Heanor West (2)
13. Heanor & Loscoe (2)
14. Ironville & Riddings (2)
15. Kilburn, Denby & Holbrook (3)
16. Langley Mill & Aldercar (2)
17. Ripley (3)
18. Ripley & Marehay (2)
19. Shipley Park, Horsley & Horsley Woodhouse (2)
20. Somercotes (2)
21. South West Parishes (1)
22. Swanwick (2)
23. Wingfield (1)

Wards from 4 May 2023 to present:

1. Alfreton (3)
2. Alport & South West Parishes (3)
3. Belper East (3)
4. Belper North (3)
5. Belper South (2)
6. Codnor, Langley Mill & Aldercar (3)
7. Crich & South Wingfield (2)
8. Duffield & Quarndon (2)
9. Heage & Ambergate (2)
10. Heanor East (2)
11. Heanor West & Loscoe (3)
12. Ironville & Riddings (2)
13. Kilburn, Denby, Holbrook & Horsley (3)
14. Ripley (3)
15. Ripley & Marehay (2)
16. Smalley, Shipley & Horsley Woodhouse (2)
17. Somercotes (2)
18. Swanwick (2)

=== Bolsover ===
Wards from 1 April 1974 (first election 7 June 1973) to 3 May 1979:

1. Ault Hucknall (1)
2. Barlborough (1)
3. Blackwell (2)
4. Bolsover Central (2)
5. Bolsover North (1)
6. Bolsover South (2)
7. Bolsover West (1)
8. Clowne (3)
9. Elmton & Creswell (3)
10. Glapwell (1)
11. Pinxton (2)
12. Pleasely (1)
13. Scarcliffe East (1)
14. Scarcliffe North (1)
15. Scarcliffe South (1)
16. Shirebrook Central (1)
17. Shirebrook East (1)
18. Shirebrook South (1)
19. Shirebrook West (2)
20. South Normanton (3)
21. Tibshelf (2)
22. Whitwell (3)

Wards from 3 May 1979 to 1 May 2003:

Wards from 1 May 2003 to 2 May 2019:

1. Barlborough (2)
2. Blackwell (2)
3. Bolsover North West (2)
4. Bolsover South (2)
5. Bolsover West (2)
6. Clowne North (2)
7. Clowne South (2)
8. Elmton-with-Creswell (3) †
9. Pinxton (2)
10. Pleasley (2)
11. Scarcliffe (2)
12. Shirebrook East (1)
13. Shirebrook Langwith (1)
14. Shirebrook North West (1)
15. Shirebrook South East (1)
16. Shirebrook South West (1)
17. South Normanton East (2)
18. South Normanton West (3)
19. Tibshelf (2)
20. Whitwell (2) †

† minor boundary changes in 2015

Wards from 2 May 2019 to present:

1. Ault Hucknall (3)
2. Barlborough (2)
3. Blackwell (2)
4. Bolsover East (2)
5. Bolsover North & Shuttlewood (2)
6. Bolsover South (2)
7. Clowne East (3)
8. Clowne West (1)
9. Elmton-with-Creswell (3)
10. Langwith (2)
11. Pinxton (2)
12. Shirebrook North (2)
13. Shirebrook South (2)
14. South Normanton East (2)
15. South Normanton West (3)
16. Tibshelf (2)
17. Whitwell (2)

=== Chesterfield ===
Wards from 1 April 1974 (first election 7 June 1973) to 3 May 1979:

1. Barrow Hill (1)
2. Brimington Central (2)
3. Brimington East (1)
4. Brimington West (2)
5. Central (3)
6. Dunston (3)
7. Hasland (3)
8. Hollingwood (1)
9. Holmebrook (3)
10. Inkersall (2)
11. Lowgates (2)
12. Markham (2)
13. Middlecroft (2)
14. Moor (3)
15. New Whittington (3)
16. Newbold (4)
17. Old Whittington (3)
18. Rother (3)
19. St Helens (3)
20. St Leonards (3)
21. West (3)
22. Woodthorpe (2)

Wards from 3 May 1979 to 1 May 2003:

Wards from 1 May 2003 to 4 May 2023:

1. Barrow Hill & New Whittington (3)
2. Brimington North (2)
3. Brimington South (3)
4. Brockwell (3)
5. Dunston (3)
6. Hasland (3)
7. Hollingwood & Inkersall (3)
8. Holmebrook (2)
9. Linacre (2)
10. Lowgates & Woodthorpe (2)
11. Loundsley Green (2)
12. Middlecroft & Poolsbrook (2)
13. Moor (2)
14. Old Whittington (2)
15. Rother (3)
16. St Helen's (2)
17. St Leonard's (3)
18. Walton (3)
19. West (3)

Wards from 4 May 2023 to present:

1. Brampton East & Boythorpe (2)
2. Brampton West & Loundsley Green (3)
3. Brimington North (2)
4. Brimington South (2)
5. Brockwell (2)
6. Dunston (3)
7. Hasland (3)
8. Linacre (2)
9. Rother (3)
10. Spire (3)
11. Staveley Central (2)
12. Staveley North (2)
13. Staveley South (3)
14. Walton (3)
15. Whittington (3)
16. Whittington Moor (2)

=== Derbyshire Dales ===
Wards from 1 April 1974 (first election 7 June 1973) to 3 May 1979:

1. No. 1 (Hartington) (1)
2. No. 2 (Brassington) (1)
3. No. 4 (Clifton) (1)
4. No. 9 (Tideswell) (2)
5. No. 10 (Bradwell) (1)
6. No. 13 (Hathersage) (1)
7. No. 14 (The Longstones) (1)
8. No. 15 (Calver) (1)
9. No. 16 (Winster) (2)
10. No. 18 (Baslow & Bubnell) (1)
11. No. 21 (Matlock) (6)
12. No. 22 (North & South Darley) (4)
13. Ashbourne (3)
14. Bakewell (3)
15. Brailsford (1)
16. Doveridge (1)
17. Eyam & Stoney Middleton (1)
18. Hulland (1)
19. Masson (2)
20. Norbury (1)
21. Taddington (1)
22. Wirksworth (3)
23. Youlgreave (1)

Wards from 3 May 1979 to 1 May 2003:

Wards from 1 May 2003 to 4 May 2023:

1. Ashbourne North (2)
2. Ashbourne South (2)
3. Bakewell (3)
4. Bradwell (1)
5. Brailsford (1)
6. Calver (1)
7. Carsington Water (1)
8. Chatsworth (1)
9. Clifton & Bradley (1)
10. Darley Dale (3)
11. Dovedale & Parwich (1)
12. Doveridge & Sudbury (1)
13. Hartington & Taddington (1)
14. Hathersage & Eyam (2)
15. Hulland (1)
16. Lathkill & Bradford (1)
17. Litton & Longstone (1)
18. Masson (2)
19. Matlock All Saints (3)
20. Matlock St Giles (3)
21. Norbury (1)
22. Stanton (1)
23. Tideswell (1)
24. Winster & South Darley (1)
25. Wirksworth (3)

Wards from 4 May 2023 to present:

1. Ashbourne North (2)
2. Ashbourne South (3)
3. Bakewell (2)
4. Bonsall & Winster (1)
5. Bradwell (1)
6. Brailsford (1)
7. Calver & Longstone (1)
8. Chatsworth (1)
9. Cromford & Matlock Bath (1)
10. Darley (3)
11. Dovedale, Parwich & Brassington (1)
12. Doveridge & Sudbury (1)
13. Hartington & Taddington (1)
14. Hathersage (2)
15. Hulland (1)
16. Matlock East & Tansley (3)
17. Matlock West (3)
18. Norbury (1)
19. Tideswell (1)
20. Wirksworth (3)
21. Youlgrave (1)

=== Erewash ===
Wards from 1 April 1974 (first election 7 June 1973) to 3 May 1979:

1. No. 1 (Ilkeston: Granby) (2)
2. No. 2 (Ilkeston: Market) (2)
3. No. 3 (Ilkeston: North) (4)
4. No. 5 (Ilkeston: South) (6)
5. No. 6 (Ilkeston: Victoria) (2)
6. No. 7 (Long Eaton: Derby Road) (6)
7. No. 8 (Long Eaton: New Sawley) (6)
8. No. 9 (Long Eaton: Nottingham Road & Sawley Road) (6)
9. No. 12 (Dale Abbey) (2)
10. No. 16 (Sandiacre) (4)
11. Breadsall & Morley (1)
12. Breaston (3)
13. Draycott (1)
14. Little Eaton (1)
15. Ockbrook & Borrowash (4)
16. Old Park (2)
17. Stanley (1)
18. West Hallam (1)

Wards from 3 May 1979 to 1 May 2003:

Wards from 1 May 2003 to 7 May 2015:

1. Abbotsford (2)
2. Breaston (2)
3. Cotmanhay (2)
4. Derby Road East (2)
5. Derby Road West (3)
6. Draycott (2)
7. Hallam Fields (2)
8. Ilkeston Central (2)
9. Ilkeston North (2)
10. Kirk Hallam (3)
11. Little Eaton & Breadsall (2)
12. Little Hallam (2)
13. Long Eaton Central (3)
14. Nottingham Road (3)
15. Ockbrook & Borrowash (3)
16. Old Park (2)
17. Sandiacre North (2)
18. Sandiacre South (2)
19. Sawley (3)
20. Stanley (1)
21. West Hallam & Dale Abbey (3)
22. Wilsthorpe (3)

Wards from 7 May 2015 to present:

1. Awsworth Road (2)
2. Breaston (2)
3. Cotmanhay (2)
4. Derby Road East (2)
5. Derby Road West (3)
6. Draycott & Risley (2)
7. Hallam Fields (2)
8. Kirk Hallam & Stanton-by-Dale (3)
9. Larklands (3)
10. Little Eaton & Stanley (2)
11. Little Hallam (2)
12. Long Eaton Central (3)
13. Nottingham Road (2)
14. Ockbrook & Borrowash (3)
15. Sandiacre (3)
16. Sawley (3)
17. Shipley View (2)
18. West Hallam & Dale Abbey (3)
19. Wilsthorpe (3)

=== High Peak ===
Wards from 1 April 1974 (first election 7 June 1973) to 3 May 1979:

1. No. 7 (Glossop: All Saints) (3)
2. No. 8 (Glossop: St James) (4)
3. No. 9 (Glossop: Hadfield) (6)
4. No. 12 (Whaley Bridge: Fernilee) (1)
5. No. 13 (Whaley Bridge: Furness Vale) (1)
6. No. 14 (Whaley Bridge: Taxal) (1)
7. No. 15 (Whaley Bridge: Yeardsley) (1)
8. No. 16 (Charlesworth) (1)
9. Barmoor (1)
10. Barms (2)
11. Blackbrook (2)
12. Central (1)
13. Chapel East (1)
14. Chapel West (2)
15. College (2)
16. Corbar (2)
17. Cote Heath (2)
18. Hayfield (1)
19. Ladybower (1)
20. Limestone Peak (1)
21. New Mills North (3)
22. New Mills South (3)
23. Peveril (1)
24. Stone Bench (2)
25. Tintwistle (1)

Wards from 3 May 1979 to 1 May 2003:

Wards from 1 May 2003 to 7 May 2015:

1. Barms (1)
2. Blackbrook (2)
3. Burbage (1)
4. Buxton Central (2)
5. Chapel East (1)
6. Chapel West (2)
7. Corbar (2)
8. Cote Heath (2)
9. Dinting (1)
10. Gamesley (1)
11. Hadfield North (1)
12. Hadfield South (2)
13. Hayfield (1)
14. Hope Valley (2)
15. Howard Town (2)
16. Limestone Peak (1)
17. New Mills East (2)
18. New Mills West (2)
19. Old Glossop (2)
20. Padfield (1)
21. St John's (1)
22. Sett (1)
23. Simmondley (2)
24. Stone Bench (2)
25. Temple (1)
26. Tintwistle (1)
27. Whaley Bridge (3)
28. Whitfield (1)

Wards from 7 May 2015 to present:

1. Barms (1)
2. Blackbrook (2)
3. Burbage (1)
4. Buxton Central (2)
5. Chapel East (1)
6. Chapel West (2)
7. Corbar (2)
8. Cote Heath (2)
9. Dinting (1)
10. Gamesley (1)
11. Hadfield North (1)
12. Hadfield South (2)
13. Hayfield (1)
14. Hope Valley (2)
15. Howard Town (2)
16. Limestone Peak (1)
17. New Mills East (2)
18. New Mills West (2)
19. Old Glossop (2)
20. Padfield (1)
21. Sett (1)
22. Simmondley (2)
23. St John’s (1)
24. Stone Bench (2)
25. Temple (1)
26. Tintwistle (1)
27. Whaley Bridge (3)
28. Whitfield (1)

=== North East Derbyshire ===
Wards from 1 April 1974 (first election 7 June 1973) to 3 May 1979:

1. No. 1 (Clay Cross) (6)
2. No. 2 (Dronfield: Central) (2)
3. No. 4 (Dronfield: Dronfield) (3)
4. No. 5 (Dronfield: North) (2)
5. No. 6 (Dronfield: South) (2)
6. No. 10 (Ashover) (2)
7. No. 11 (Eckington) (3)
8. No. 14 (Killamarsh) (3)
9. No. 16 (Calow) (2)
10. No. 17 (Heath) (1)
11. No. 20 (North Wingfield) (4)
12. No. 22 (Shirland & Higham) (3)
13. No. 23 (Sutton-cum-Duckmanton) (1)
14. Barlow & Holmesfield (1)
15. Brampton & Walton (2)
16. Coal Aston (2)
17. Grassmoor (2)
18. Pilsley (2)
19. Renishaw (1)
20. Ridgeway & Marsh Lane (1)
21. Tupton (2)
22. Unstone (1)
23. Wingerworth (3)

Wards from 3 May 1979 to 1 May 2003:

Wards from 1 May 2003 to 2 May 2019:

1. Ashover (1)
2. Barlow & Holmesfield (1)
3. Brampton & Walton (2)
4. Clay Cross North (3)
5. Clay Cross South (2)
6. Coal Aston (2)
7. Dronfield North (2)
8. Dronfield South (3)
9. Dronfield Woodhouse (2)
10. Eckington North (2)
11. Eckington South (2)
12. Gosforth Valley (3)
13. Grassmoor (2)
14. Holmewood & Heath (2)
15. Killamarsh East (2)
16. Killamarsh West (3)
17. North Wingfield Central (3)
18. Pilsley & Morton (3)
19. Renishaw (1)
20. Ridgeway & Marsh Lane (1)
21. Shirland (3)
22. Sutton (2)
23. Tupton (2)
24. Unstone (1)
25. Wingerworth (3)

Wards from 2 May 2019 to present:

1. Ashover (1)
2. Barlow & Holmesfield (1)
3. Brampton & Walton (2)
4. Clay Cross North (3)
5. Clay Cross South (2)
6. Coal Aston (2)
7. Dronfield North (2)
8. Dronfield South (3)
9. Dronfield Woodhouse (1)
10. Eckington North (2)
11. Eckington South & Renishaw (3)
12. Gosforth Valley (3)
13. Grassmoor (2)
14. Holmewood & Heath (2)
15. Killamarsh East (2)
16. Killamarsh West (3)
17. North Wingfield Central (3)
18. Pilsley & Morton (3)
19. Ridgeway & Marsh Lane (1)
20. Shirland (3)
21. Sutton (2)
22. Tupton (3)
23. Unstone (1)
24. Wingerworth (3)

=== South Derbyshire ===
Wards from 1 April 1974 (first election 7 June 1973) to 3 May 1979:

1. No. 1 (Swadlincote: Church Gresley) (3)
2. No. 2 (Swadlincote: Stanton & Newhall) (5)
3. No. 3 (Swadlincote: Swadlincote) (4)
4. No. 4 (Linton) (2)
5. No. 5 (Overseal) (3)
6. No. 6 (Hartshorne & Woodville) (4)
7. No. 7 (Repton & Bretby) (2)
8. No. 8 (Findern) (1)
9. No. 9 (Etwall) (2)
10. No. 11 (Hatton) (1)
11. No. 12 (Hilton) (1)
12. No. 13 (Burnaston) (1)
13. No. 14 (Aston-on-Trent & Shardlow) (2)
14. No. 15 (Melbourne) (3)
15. Willington (1)

Wards from 3 May 1979 to 1 May 2003:

Wards from 1 May 2003 to 5 May 2011:

1. Aston (3)
2. Church Gresley (2)
3. Etwall (2)
4. Hartshorne & Ticknall (2)
5. Hatton (1)
6. Hilton (2)
7. Linton (2)
8. Melbourne (2)
9. Midway (3)
10. Newhall & Stanton (3)
11. North West (1)
12. Repton (2)
13. Seales (2)
14. Stenson (2)
15. Swadlincote (3)
16. Willington & Findern (2)
17. Woodville (2)

Wards from 5 May 2011 to present:

1. Aston (3)
2. Church Gresley (3)
3. Etwall (2)
4. Hatton (1)
5. Hilton (3)
6. Linton (2)
7. Melbourne (2)
8. Midway (3)
9. Newhall & Stanton (3)
10. Repton (2)
11. Seales (2)
12. Stenson (2)
13. Swadlincote (3)
14. Willington & Findern (2)
15. Woodville (3)

== Electoral wards by constituency ==
Wards as they existed on 1 December 2020.

=== Amber Valley ===
Amber Valley: Alferton; Codnor & Wainsgroves; Heage & Ambergate; Heanor & Loscoe; Heanor East; Heanor West; Ironville & Riddings; Kilburn, Denby & Holbrook; Langley Mill & Aldercar; Ripley; Ripley & Marehay; Shipley Park, Horsley & Horsley Woodhouse; Somercotes; Swanwick; Wingfield.

=== Bolsover ===
Bolsover: Ault Hucknall; Barlborough; Blackwell; Bolsover East; Bolsover North & Shuttlewood; Bolsover South; Clowne East; Clowne West; Elmton-with-Creswell; Langwith; Pinxton; Shirebrook North; Shirebrook South; South Normanton East; South Normanton West; Tibshelf; Whitwell.

North East Derbyshire: Holmewood & Heath; Pilsley & Morton; Shirland; Sutton.

=== Chesterfield ===
Chesterfield: Brimington North; Brimington South; Brockwell; Dunston; Hasland; Hollingwood & Inkersall; Holmebrook; Linacre; Loundsley Green; Middlecroft & Poolsbrook; Moor; Old Whittington; Rother; St. Helen’s; St. Leonard’s; Walton; West.

=== Derby North ===
Derby: Abbey; Chaddesden; Darley; Derwent; Littleover; Mackworth; Mickleover.

=== Derby South ===
Derby: Alvaston; Arboretum; Blagreaves; Boulton; Chellaston; Normanton; Sinfin.

=== Derbyshire Dales ===
Amber Valley: Alport; Crich.

Derbyshire Dales: Ashbourne North; Ashbourne South; Bakewell; Bradwell; Brailsford; Calver; Carsington Water; Chatsworth; Clifton & Bradley; Darley Dale; Dovedale & Parwich; Doveridge & Sudbury; Hartington & Taddington; Hathersage & Eyam; Hulland; Lathkill & Bradford; Litton & Longstone; Masson; Matlock All Saints; Matlock St Giles; Norbury; Stanton; Tideswell; Winster & South Darley; Wirksworth.

South Derbyshire: Hatton; Hilton.

=== Erewash ===
Erewash: Awsworth Road; Breaston; Cotmanhay; Derby Road East; Derby Road West; Draycott & Risley; Hallam Fields; Kirk Hallam & Stanton-by-Dale; Larklands; Little Hallam; Long Eaton Central; Nottingham Road; Sandiacre; Sawley; Shipley View; Wilsthorpe.

=== High Peak ===
High Peak: Barms, Blackbrook, Burbage, Buxton Central, Chapel East, Chapel West, Corbar, Cote Heath, Dinting, Gamesley, Hadfield North, Hadfield South, Hayfield, Hope Valley, Howard Town, Limestone Peak, New Mills East, New Mills West, Old Glossop, Padfield, St John's, Sett, Simmondley, Stone Bench, Temple, Tintwistle, Whaley Bridge, Whitfield.

=== Mid Derbyshire ===
Amber Valley: Belper Central; Belper East; Belper North; Belper South; Duffield; South West Parishes.

Derby: Allestree; Oakwood; Spondon.

Erewash: Little Eaton & Stanley; Ockbrook & Borrowash; West Hallam & Dale Abbey.

=== North East Derbyshire ===
Chesterfield: Barrow Hill & New Whittington; Lowgates & Woodthorpe.

North East Derbyshire: Ashover; Barlow & Holmesfield; Brampton & Walton; Clay Cross North; Clay Cross South; Coal Aston; Dronfield North; Dronfield South; Dronfield Woodhouse; Eckington North; Eckington South & Renishaw; Gosforth Valley; Grassmoor; Killamarsh East; Killamarsh West; North Wingfield Central; Ridgeway & Marsh Lane; Tupton; Unstone; Wingerworth.

=== South Derbyshire ===
South Derbyshire: Aston; Church Gresley; Etwall; Linton; Melbourne; Midway; Newhall & Stanton; Repton; Seales; Stenson; Swadlincote; Willington & Findern; Woodville.

== See also ==
- List of parliamentary constituencies in Derbyshire
