= Northampton Museum and Art Gallery =

Museum in Northampton, England

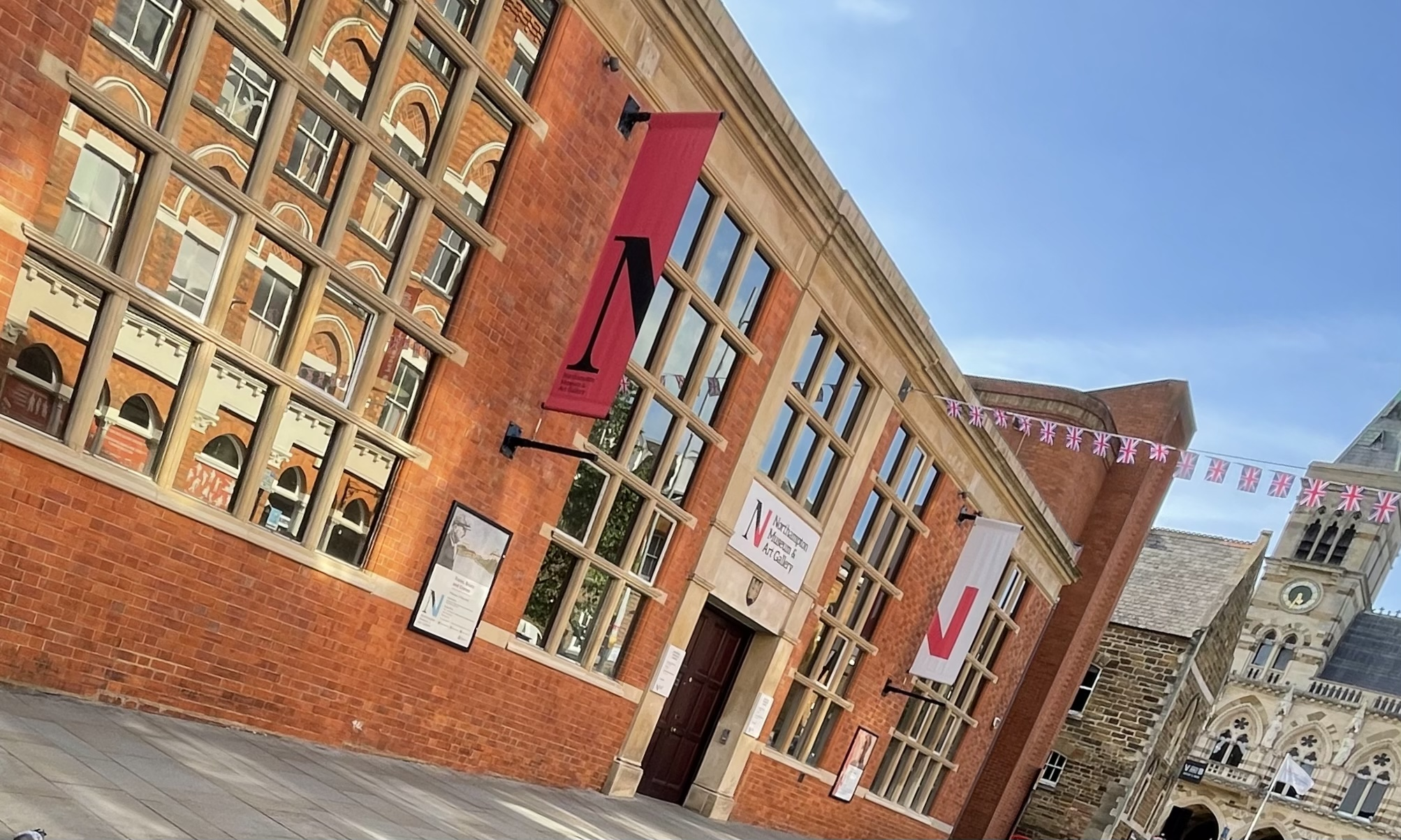
- The main entrance to Northampton Museum in May 2023
- Established: 1884
- Location: Guildhall Road, Northampton, England
- Coordinates: 52.2366°N 0.8946°W
- Website: www.northamptonmuseums.com

Northampton Museum and Art Gallery is a public museum in Northampton, England. The museum is owned and run by West Northamptonshire Council and houses one of the largest collection of shoes in the world, with over 15,000 pairs, which was designated by Arts Council England as being of local, national and international importance.

The town's museum was established in 1865, but moved to the current site in 1884, where it shared its space with the town's library. After the library moved in 1910, the museum took over the whole building. The museum was extended in 1935 and again in 1988. In 2012, the museum was refurbished for better access.

The museum closed between 2017 and 2021 for a major £6.7m expansion project. The new museum reopened in July 2021, more than a year later than planned due to the COVID-19 pandemic.

== Exhibits ==
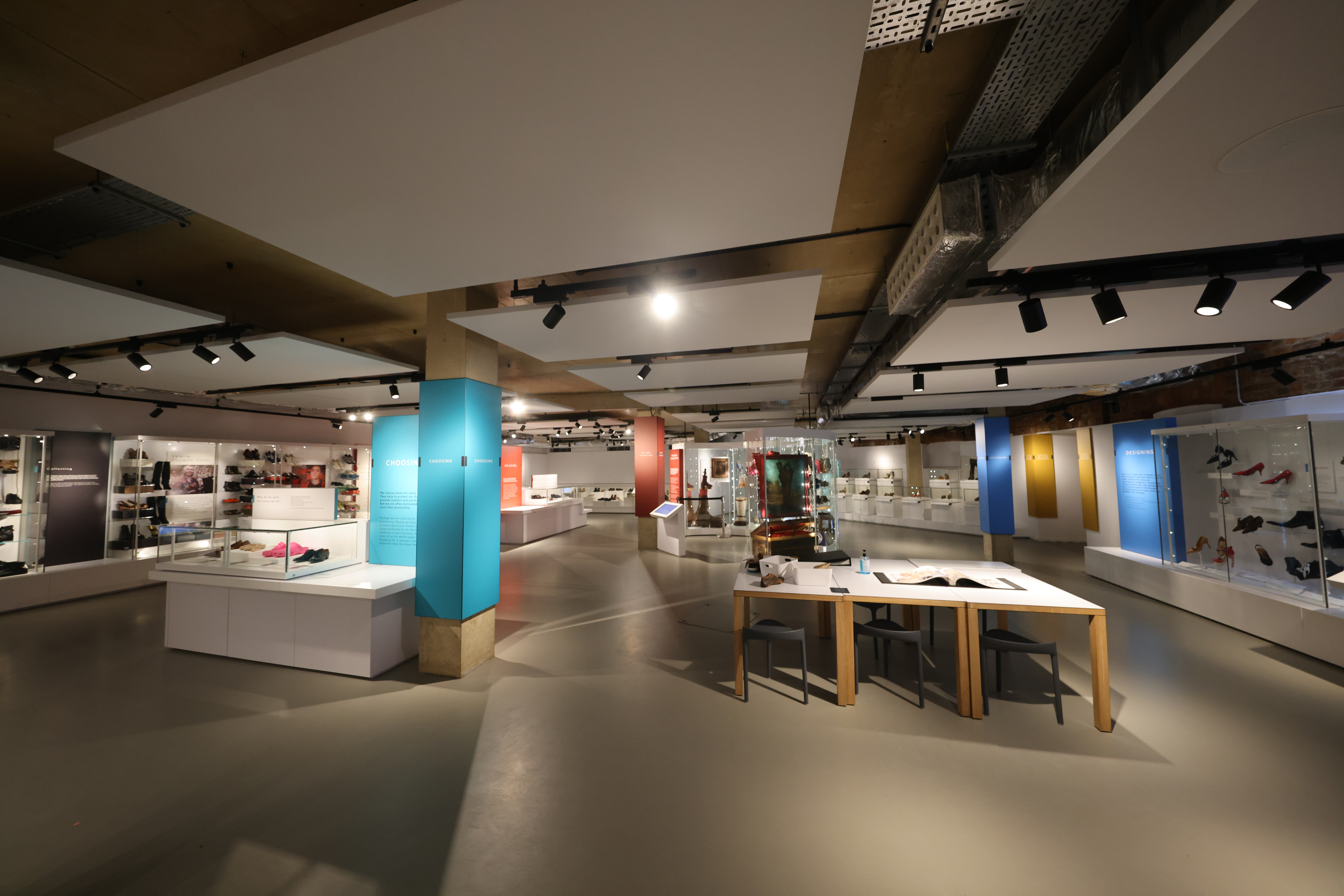
The Shoe gallery

The museum has been collecting footwear since the 1870s and now boasts the largest collection of shoes in the world, which was designated as being of international importance by the Museums, Libraries and Archives Council in 1997. The ground floor is given over to the display of some of the museum's 12,000 pairs of shoes, spanning the period from the Ancient Egyptians to the present day. There are also two galleries dedicated to footwear: Life & Sole focuses on the history of shoemaking and contains a re-creation of an old shoe factory; Followers of Fashion concentrates on the history of fashions in footwear throughout the centuries. Some of the paintings on display reflect the museum's focus on footwear, such as the 17th-19th century Dutch and Flemish works by Jan Miel and Hendrik van Oort featuring cobblers, shoemakers and shoeshiners. As long-time Keeper of the Boot and Shoe Collection, curator June Swann played a significant role in its development. She began in 1950, and worked there for 38 years.

The second and third floors of the museum house exhibits about Northampton's history and displays of Oriental ceramics and Italian art from the 15th to the 18th century.

== Sekhemka statue controversy ==
The museum conducted a controversial sale of an Ancient Egyptian statue of Sekhemka in July 2014, with questions relating to the ownership and the ethics of selling the statue being raised by various organizations. The statue was sold to an unknown buyer for £15.76m, which broke the existing world record for Ancient Egyptian artwork at auction. On 1 August 2014, Northampton Museums had its accreditation removed by the Arts Council England, which ruled that the sale broke the required standards for how museums manage their collections; loss of accreditation includes ineligibility for a range of arts grants and funding, and is in effect until at the earliest, August 2019.

== See also ==
- Northampton Sekhemka statue
