= David van der Kellen Jr. =

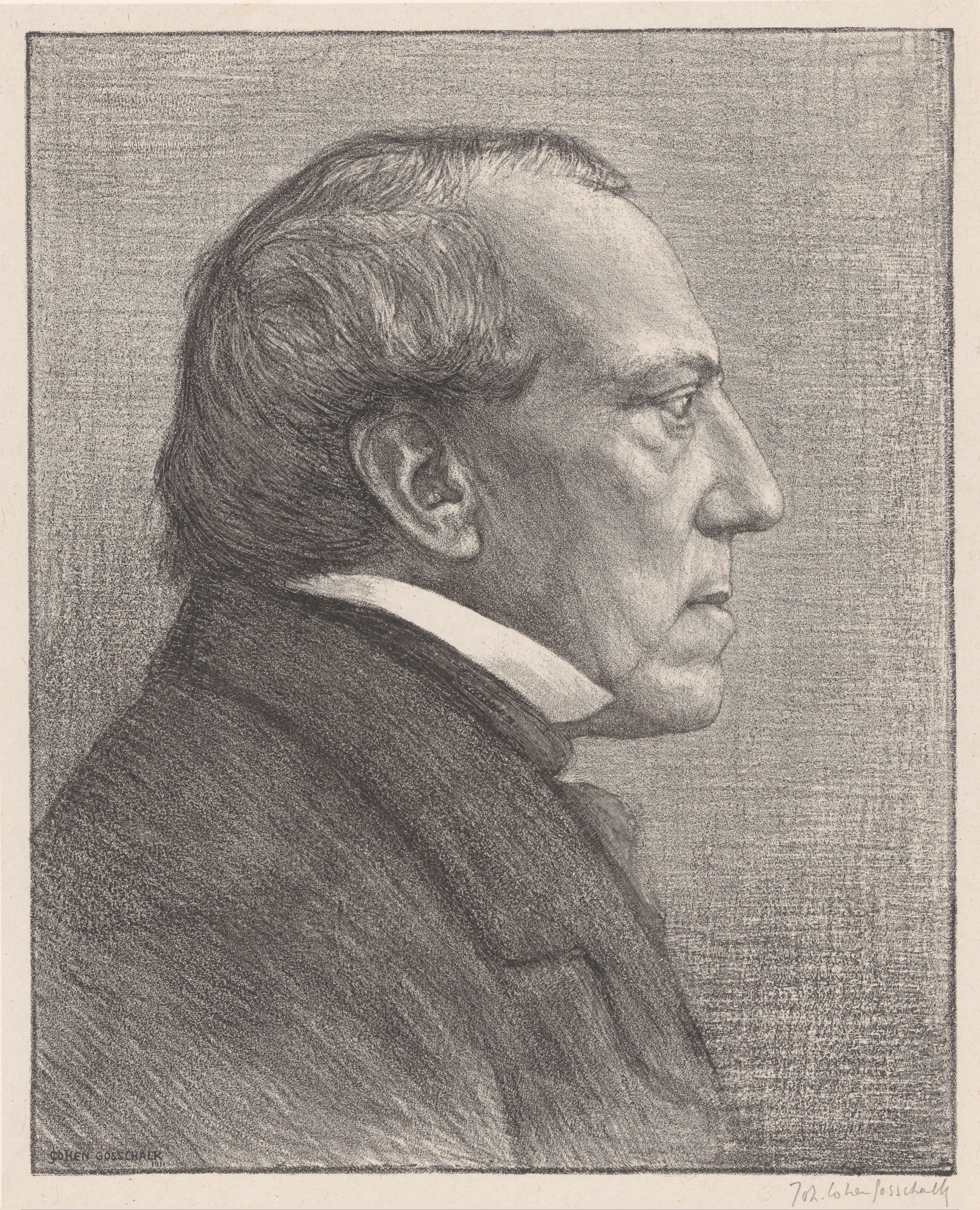
- David van der Kellen Jr.
- Born: 1804; Amsterdam, Batavian Commonwealth
- Died: 1879 (aged 74–75); Utrecht, Netherlands
- Occupations: Engraver; Medallist

David van der Kellen Jr. (1804 in Amsterdam – 1879 in Utrecht), was a 19th-century engraver and medallist from the Northern Netherlands.

== Biography ==
According to the RKD he was a pupil of his father David van der Kellen Sr., Hendrik van Oort, and Bruno van Straaten. He was a student of the Utrecht artist society 'Kunstliefde' and the city academy there. He made medals for special occasions as well as official coins and became the mint master for the city of Utrecht after his father died in 1825. He was the father of Johan Philip van der Kellen, who succeeded him at the Utrecht mint, and David III, who became a painter and museum director.
