= West Northamptonshire Council elections =

Local government elections in Northamptonshire, England

West Northamptonshire Council elections are held every four years. West Northamptonshire Council is a unitary authority covering the western part of the ceremonial county of Northamptonshire. Following boundary changes which took effect for the 2025 election, 76 councillors are elected from 35 wards. The council was created as a merger of Daventry District Council, Northampton Borough Council, and South Northamptonshire District Council.

== Council elections ==
Year	Reform UK	Conservative	Labour	Liberal Democrats	Independent	Council control after election
2021	0	66	20	5	2	Conservative
2025 (Note: Boundary changes reduced the number of seats by 17.)	42	17	9	6	2	Reform

=== Results maps ===
2021 results map

2025 results map

== By-elections ==
=== 2021-2025 ===
East Hunsbury and Shelfleys By-Election 8 February 2024
Party	Candidate	Votes	%	±%
Liberal Democrats	Carl Squires	820	38.8	+15.8
Conservative	Daniel Soan	746	35.3	−16.2
Labour Co-op	Clare Robertson-Marriott	547	25.9	+0.4
Majority		74	3.5	
Turnout		2,123		
Liberal Democrats gain from Conservative		Swing		

=== 2025-2029 ===
Hackleton & Roade by-election, 7 May 2026
Party	Candidate	Votes	%	±%
Conservative	Maggie Clubley	1051	24.0	
Labour	Peter French	212	5.0	
Independent	Ron Johnson	203	5.0	
Green	Dave Pearson	623	14.0	
Liberal Democrats	Stephen Gordon Shellabear	986	22.0	
Reform	Laura Christine Weston	1355	31.0	
Turnout		4430	50	
Registered electors		8,807		
