= 2025 West Northamptonshire Council election =

2025 UK local government election

- 1 May 2025

All 76 seats on West Northamptonshire Council 39 seats needed for a majority
- Turnout: 35% (▲5 pp)
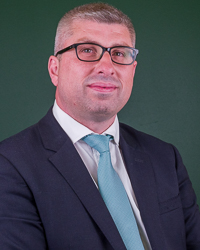

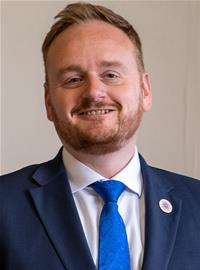

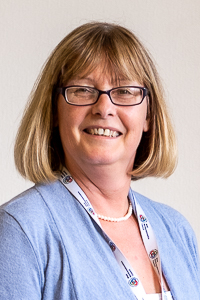

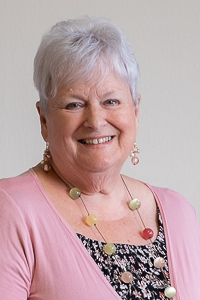

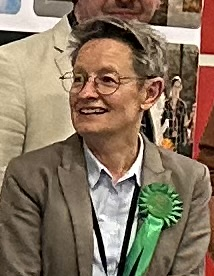
	First party	Second party	Third party
Leader	Mark Arnull (Note: Chair of their local party, as their party had no council representation prior)	Adam Brown (defeated)	Wendy Randall (defeated)
Party	Reform	Conservative	Labour
Leader since	14 May 2025	16 May 2024	3 May 2022
Leader's seat	Kingsthorpe North (Note: Not the incumbent, but stood in this ward and won.)	Bugbrooke; Ran in Campion	Daventry West; Ran in Daventry South
Last election	0 seats, 0.18%	66 seats, 50.80%	20 seats, 25.02%
Seats won	42	17	9
Seat change	N/A	N/A	N/A
Popular vote	71,966	56,665	42,589
Percentage	33.0%	26.0%	19.5%
Swing	▲32.82 pp	▼24.82 pp	▼5.49 pp
	Fourth party	Fifth party	Sixth party
		Ind
Leader	Sally Beardsworth (defeated)	N/A	Emmie Willliamson (lost)
Party	Liberal Democrats	Independent	Green
Leader's seat	Kingsthorpe South; Ran in Kingsthorpe North	N/A	Ran in Towcester
Last election	5 seats, 15.81%	2 seats, 3.11%	0 seats, 4.47%
Seats won	6	2	0
Seat change	N/A	N/A	N/A
Popular vote	25,348	7,224	13,727
Percentage	11.6%	3.3%	6.3%
Swing	▼4.19 pp	▲0.20 pp	▲1.82 pp
- Results by ward Reform UK Conservative Party Labour Party Liberal Democrats Independent

- Composition of the Council after the election Reform UK Conservative Party Labour Party Liberal Democrats Independent
Leader of the Council before election
Adam Brown
Conservative
Elected Leader of the Council
Mark Arnull
Reform

The 2025 West Northamptonshire Council election took place on 1 May 2025 to elect 76 councillors to West Northamptonshire Council (WNC), the unitary authority that runs local government services in West Northamptonshire, England as part of nationwide local elections. This was the second election to the council since its creation in 2021, and the first conducted under its new electoral boundaries.

The election followed a turbulent period for the incumbent Conservative administration, who entered the campaign weakened by a series of high-profile resignations and internal controversies. A record 355 candidates contested the 76 seats across 35 wards. The poll took place against a backdrop of wider political changes, including Labour's victory in the 2024 Northamptonshire Police, Fire and Crime Commissioner election and gains in parliamentary constituencies in the 2024 UK general election.

The election result saw Reform UK win 42 seats from 0 in 2021, winning a majority and taking control of the council from the Conservative Party, which won 17 – a significant reduction from the 66 won in 2021. The Labour Party won 9 seats, a decrease from the 20 won in 2021 and falling to the third-largest group, while the Liberal Democrats won 6 seats and independent candidates won 2 seats.

== Background ==
West Northamptonshire Council (WNC) was created in 2021 following a brief existence as a "shadow authority", with its first elections held on 6 May 2021. Following the 2021 West Northamptonshire Council election, the Conservative Party won an overall majority on the new council. The 2021 election was held as part of the 2021 local elections, in which the Conservatives won multiple elections after a "vaccine bump". The Conservatives had controlled the preceding Northamptonshire County Council and both new Unitary authorities for 20 years prior to the election.

Prior to the election, the Conservative group, led by Adam Brown, had 58 seats, following former leader Jonathan Nunn becoming an independent following claims of abuse, three members resigning from the council, and four councillors becoming independents. The West Northamptonshire Liberal Democrats gained an additional seat after winning a by-election in East Hunsbury and Shelfleys ward in February 2024. The Labour group, led by Wendy Randall, gained an additional councillor in November 2024, and lost a councillor in December 2024.

The seven independent councillors were formed of three "Aligned" Independents and four "Non-Aligned" Independents, with the aligned independent group (Paul Clark, Ian McCord, Richard Solesbury-Timms) being led by Ian McCord, and the Non-Aligned independents (Julie Davenport, Louisa Fowler, Paul Joyce, Jonathan Nunn) not having a leader. The Conservatives, Labour and Reform UK each contested all 76 seats; the Liberal Democrats fielded 57 candidates and the Green Party fielded 43. The seven independent councillors were formed of three "Aligned" Independents and four "Non-Aligned" Independents, with the aligned independent group (Paul Clark, Ian McCord, Richard Solesbury-Timms) being led by Ian McCord, and the Non-Aligned independents (Julie Davenport, Louisa Fowler, Paul Joyce, Jonathan Nunn) not having a leader. A record number of candidates stood in Northamptonshire's 2025 local elections, including 355 candidates for the council's 76 seats across 35 wards, equivalent to averages of 4.67 candidates per seat and 10.14 candidates per ward. The Conservatives, Labour and Reform UK each contested all 76 seats; the Liberal Democrats fielded 57 candidates and the Green Party fielded 43.

The political climate shifted significantly since the previous election in 2021, with Labour winning the 2024 Northamptonshire police, fire and crime commissioner election from the Conservatives, with 37.4% of the vote within West Northamptonshire compared to the Conservative 34.9% and the Liberal Democrat 27.7%. Further, in the 2024 United Kingdom general election Labour won two of the four parliamentary seats (Northampton North and Northampton South) from the Conservatives within the district, while the Conservatives retained two (Daventry and South Northamptonshire).

=== Leadership ===
Council leader from the 2021 election to the 2025 election
Party	Leader	Term
Conservative	Jonathan Nunn	12 May 2021 – 18 April 2024
Conservative	Adam Brown	16 May 2024 – (1 May 2025)

=== Electoral system ===
Registered voters that reside within a ward were eligible to vote, with each voter being entitled to 1–3 votes depending on the number of councillors that were allocated to that ward. Voting registration closed on 11th April 2024. 39 seats were needed for a majority on the council. If a single party failed to gain an overall majority, the council would result in no overall control. In this case, the largest party in the council could form a minority administration, or a coalition could be formed of different parties and/or independents to govern the council. The votes were counted at Benham Sports Centre, Northampton, with the results published on 3 May 2025.

=== Ward changes ===
A total of 76 councillors were elected, a reduction from the previous number of 93 in 2021. This followed a review of the Local Government Boundary Commission for England, as the wards used in the 2021 election were a duplication of the wards used by Northamptonshire County Council, meaning many were outside of the permitted electoral range as they were originally created in 2011 for the 2013 Northamptonshire County Council election.

13 wards elected three councillors, 15 wards elected two councillors, and 7 wards elected one councillor each, on a total of 35 wards, an increase from the previous number of 31 three-member wards.

=== Council composition ===
Party	After 2021 election	Before 2025 election	2025 election result
Conservative	66	58	17
Labour	20	20	9
Liberal Democrats	5	6	6
Independent	2	7	2
Reform	0	0	42
Vacant	0	2	0

== Campaign ==
Aggregate seats contested by party
Party	Seats
Conservative	76 / 76 (100%)
Labour	76 / 76 (100%)
Reform UK	76 / 76 (100%)
Liberal Democrats	57 / 76 (75%)
Green	43 / 76 (57%)

The pre-election period officially began on 14 March 2025, when the notice of election was published. The deadline for candidate nominations and withdrawal of nominations was 2 April 2025.

Ronald Firman, a Reform UK candidate for Hunsbury ward, was criticised during the campaign for racist remarks made on a Twitter account dating back to 2017. Reform UK declined to comment on the remarks. Another Reform UK candidate for Kingsthorpe North, Nigel Berrill, appeared in court for several driving related offences and was fined £241 with 6 points on his driving license. Another Reform UK candidate, Thomas Manning, appeared in court for assaulting a police officer and criminal damage.

Both Reform UK and the Conservatives ruled out a formal post-election coalition in West Northamptonshire, with West Northamptonshire Conservative leader Adam Brown saying "we have no interest in a coalition of any sort", and a Reform UK spokesperson stating "There’ll be no formal coalitions with anybody".

=== Manifestos ===
The Conservatives' manifesto, entitled "The next moves forward", promised not to introduce a "ULEZ style scheme" in West Northamptonshire, and to limit council tax increases to below the referendum threshold of 5% and reduce the increases over time. However, the incumbent Conservative administration's council budget assumed the maximum 4.99% increases within their medium term financial plan. The Conservatives launched their manifesto, entitled "The Next Moves Forward", at a farm outside Towcester. The Northampton Chronicle & Echo reported that dozens of candidates and supporters attended the launch, and that the manifesto set out commitments under three themes: "Our Council", "Our Places" and "Our People". The manifesto promised not to introduce a "ULEZ style scheme" in West Northamptonshire, and to limit council tax increases to below the referendum threshold of 5% and reduce the increases over time. However, the incumbent Conservative administration's council budget assumed the maximum 4.99% increases within their medium term financial plan.

The Liberal Democrats on 3 April launched their campaign with their manifesto, entitled "A People First Council for West Northamptonshire". The Liberal Democrats stated that they wanted to do things differently with a manifesto focused on prevention and planning, unlike the Conservatives who they claimed to be continuing with the same failed reactionary policies.

The Labour Party launched their manifesto on 8 April, entitled "Fixing the Foundations of West Northants" with five key pledges on council finances, NHS and social care, crime, roads, and cost-of-living. The election also saw the highest number of candidates standing as Labour Co-op in the 2025 local elections.

Reform UK did not have any specific local manifesto, and instead campaigned on national issues, the creation of a "Doge-style" department for both West and North Northamptonshire and a full audit of council finances. Additionally, they supported the revival of the previous two-tier structure of local government of Northamptonshire County Council and individual district councils, and a mayoral devolution deal to cover the county without including Luton, Bedford, and Milton Keynes.

TUSC stated that they were standing for people who feel let down by the main parties' stances on the Gaza war, the infected blood and Post Office scandals, lack of appropriate social housing, and cutbacks in the NHS and in other social care provision.

==== Highways ====
The Conservatives said that their priority would be ‘ongoing highway investment’, citing a £200 million price for full repair of all roads, and that they would instead focusing on increasing efficiency and quality of repairs through technology. Green Party candidates have called for WNC's highways contract with Kier Highways to be re-examined, and to encourage them to innovate and trial new technologies, emphasising resurfacing over temporary pothole fixes. Labour stated that they would deliver better-maintained roads and pavements by evaluating highways contractors to emphasise value for money. The Liberal Democrats said they would develop ‘pothole priority plan’ to target problem areas and replace worn-out roads with permanent solutions, proactively identifiying vulnerable roads, as well as keeping the highways contract under constant review with data on highway repairs by ward. Reform UK said that they would focus on fixing entire roads rather than temporary patches.

==== Regeneration ====
The Conservatives committed to establish local boards to provide input on town centre improvements, as well as committed to strengthening town centre managers, also committing to increase affordable homes and temporary accommodation. The Green Party committed to preventing overdevelopment, saying that proposals for new development which do not include infrastructure upgrades would not be approved, and saying that they would give greater transparency on Section 106 contributions. Labour said they would bring forward schemes for brownfield site development, as well as focusing on the delivery of social housing and affordable housing, additionally committing to investment in local communities including plans to work with town councils to deliver ‘thriving places’. The Liberal Democrats pushed for bring empty homes to be brought back to use, stating that they would allocate £20 million to acquire properties to expand the social housing stock, also giving commitments to greater support for first-time buyers. Reform UK stated that overdevelopment needed to be stopped, planning to hold to account developers to deliver promised infrastructure and Section 106 agreements for larger developments.

==== Environment ====
The Conservatives committed in their manifesto to increasing fly-tipping enforcement, keeping waste and recycling centres open seven days a week, and to ensure solar panels are installed in ‘appropriate’ locations and not farmland. The Green Party said that high fines for fly-tipping were ineffective, instead advocating for council waste centres keep charges minimal. Labour said they would appoint additional Neighbourhood Wardens in a drive against fly-tipping and litter, as well as committed to improving air quality by rolling out electric buses, and investigating the installation of a park and ride. The Liberal Democrats said they would focus on reducing the council’s own carbon footprint, as well as identifying suitable locations for renewable energy.

=== Local issues ===
Issues in Brackley included high-speed broadband internet, transport provision, a banking hub, school places, and the condition of roads. In Daventry, the Conservatives begain their campaign by announcing the cancellation of controversial plans to build on the Eastern Way Playing Fields in Daventry following a local campaign involving several petitions, meetings and gatherings. The plan was originally launched by the Conservative administration in their 2024 'Masterplan'. The Conservative administration announced the reversal of the plan on 28 February and the Conservatives were delivering leaflets the next day declaring the cancellation to be a success.

In Towcester, an issue of contention involved a plan by DHL for a two warehouses as part of a planned new logistics hub outside of Towcester became the subject of controversy in 2024 and 2025, with a grassroots campaign, "Save Towcester Now", being set up to oppose the scheme. Council planning officers recommended the plan for approval, but councillors voted to reject the scheme. DHL appealed the rejection to the Planning Inspectorate, which opened a public inquiry in February 2025 and closed it on 21 March 2025. The scheme was announced to be proceeding on 11 April 2025.

=== Opinion polling ===
Pollster	Date(s) conducted	Sample size	Con	Lab	Lib Dem	Green	Ind/Other	Reform	Lead
2025 election	1 May 2025	–	26%	20%	12%	6%	3%	33%	7
Electoral Calculus (MRP)	1–10 Mar 2025	5,421	29%	23%	12%	5%	4%	27%	2
2021 election	6 May 2021	–	50.6%	24.25%	16.28%	4.63%	3.42%	0.18%	26

==== Seat projections ====
One MRP poll was carried out during the election by Electoral Calculus. MRP polls can indicate local support for parties, but cannot account for ward-level factors such as locally popular candidates and local party canvassing strengths.

Pollster	Date(s) conducted	Sample size	Con	Lab	Lib Dem	Green	Ind/Other	Reform	Majority
2025 election	1 May 2025	–	17	9	6	0	2	42	Ref 3
Electoral Calculus (MRP)	1–10 Mar 2025	5,421 (Note: National poll sample)	36	17	0	0	0	23	NOC (Con 3 short)
2021 (notional) (Note: 2021 seat results modified to reflect the reduced number of seats available in 2025.)	6 May 2021	–	54	16	4	0	2	0	Con 27
2021 election	6 May 2021	–	66	20	5	0	2	0	Con 27

== Results ==
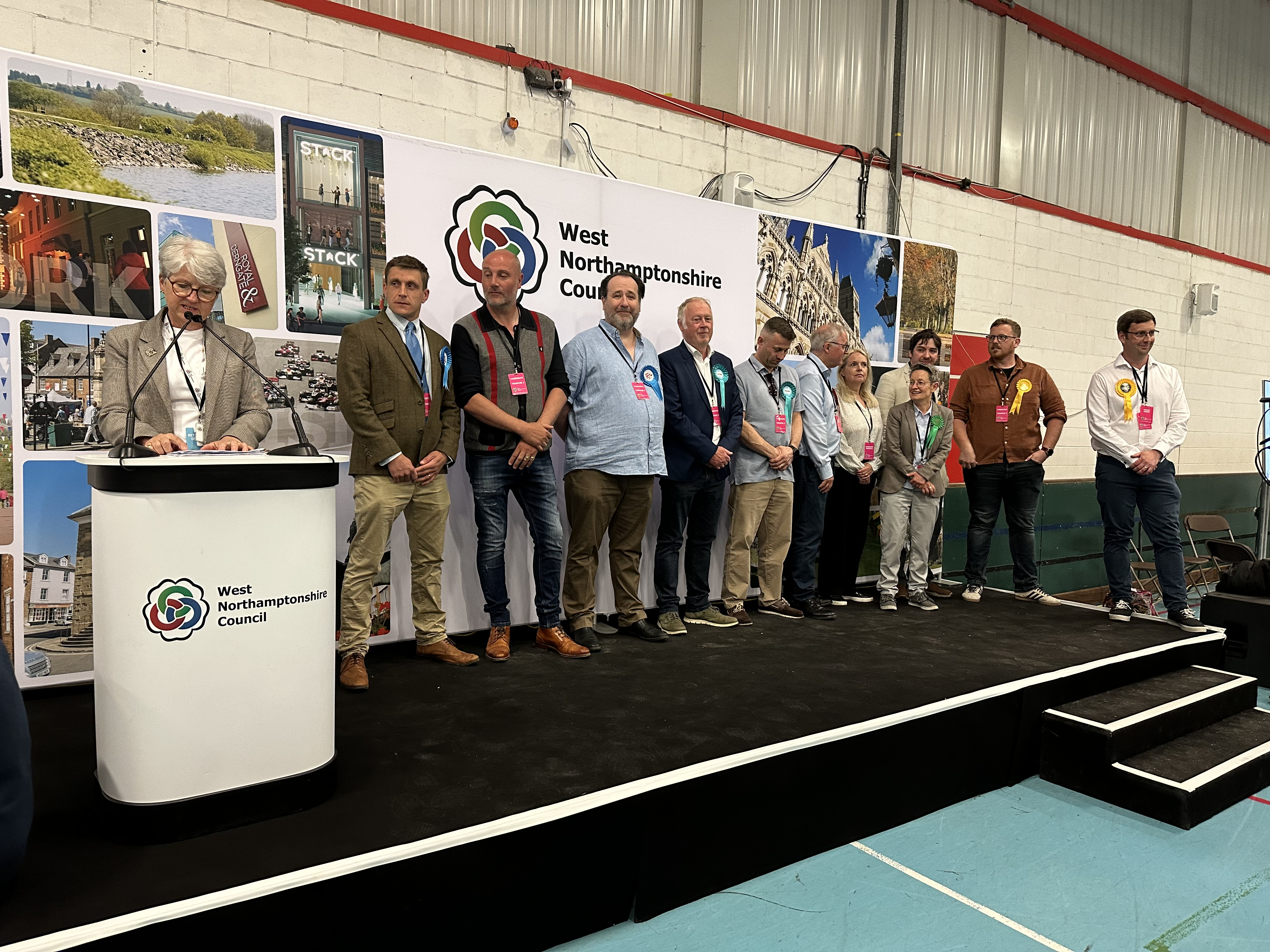
Declaration of the results of Towcester ward, the final result of the 2025 local elections

Seats won (outer ring) versus total number of votes (inner ring) Reform UK Conservative Party Labour Party Liberal Democrats Independent

The counting of the first tranche of ballots began at 13:30 BST. The counting of the second tranche was due to begin at 15:30. However, the timing was chaotic with tranches overlapping, and the final results not being declared until 21:35, the last in the country.

The 2025 election used new ward boundaries and elected 76 councillors rather than 93, so seat gains and losses are not directly comparable with 2021.

2025 West Northamptonshire Council election result
Party	Candidates	Seats	Gains	Losses	Net gain/loss	Seats %	Votes %	Votes	+/−
Reform	76	42	N/A	N/A	N/A	55.3	33.0	71,966	+32.8
Conservative	76	17	N/A	N/A	N/A	22.4	26.0	56,665	-24.8
Labour	76	9	N/A	N/A	N/A	11.8	19.5	42,589	-5.5
Liberal Democrats	57	6	N/A	N/A	N/A	7.9	11.6	25,348	-4.2
Independent	20	2	N/A	N/A	N/A	2.6	3.3	7,224	+0.2
Green	43	0	N/A	N/A	N/A	0.0	6.3	13,727	+1.8
TUSC	5	0	N/A	N/A	N/A	0%	0.2	345	-0.1
Heritage	1	0	N/A	N/A	N/A	0.0	0.1	157	±0.0
SDP	1	0	N/A	N/A	N/A	0	<0.0	78	N/A

== List of results by ward ==
Incumbent councillors for that ward are indicated with ‡. Councillors who are standing for election in a different ward are denoted with *.

Abington & Phippsville (2 member)
Party	Candidate	Votes	%	±%
Labour	Zoe Smith ‡	958	41.3	N/A
Labour	Bob Purser ‡	904	39.0	N/A
Reform	Alan John Coles	532	22.9	N/A
Reform	Gerald Roland Lamb	493	21.3	N/A
Conservative	Sian Bateman	303	13.1	N/A
Conservative	Charles Breese	277	11.9	N/A
Green	Luke Adams	274	11.8	N/A
Green	Esther Pearson	266	11.5	N/A
Liberal Democrats	Ana Savage Gunn	221	9.5	N/A
Liberal Democrats	James Tarry	158	6.8	N/A
TUSC	Alex Twigley	51	2.2	N/A
Turnout		2,332	26.52	N/A
Registered electors		8,792		
Rejected ballots		13	0.6	N/A
Labour win (new seat)				
Labour win (new seat)				

Billing (2 member)
Party	Candidate	Votes	%	±%
Reform	Mark Deakes	875	37.9	N/A
Reform	Silas Hays	712	30.8	N/A
Independent	Paul Clark*	658	28.5	N/A
Conservative	James William Hill*	656	28.4	N/A
Labour	Janice Duffy *	394	17.0	N/A
Labour	Gary Campbell	365	15.8	N/A
Conservative	Naz Islam	290	12.5	N/A
Green	Faye Sophia Spencer	205	8.9	N/A
Liberal Democrats	Russell Ellis	167	7.2	N/A
Turnout		2,316	30.3	N/A
Registered electors		7,643		
Rejected ballots		5	0.2	N/A
Reform win (new seat)				
Reform win (new seat)				

Blackthorn & Rectory Farm (2 member)
Party	Candidate	Votes	%	±%
Reform	Jeff Johnson	642	33.3	N/A
Labour	Keith Holland-Delamere*	633	32.8	N/A
Reform	Alan Price	604	31.3	N/A
Labour	Bisola Funmilayo Ogunro	444	23.0	N/A
Conservative	Taylor Cowley-Coulton	420	21.8	N/A
Conservative	Peter John Spink	342	17.7	N/A
Green	Lauren Gilkes	197	10.2	N/A
Liberal Democrats	Mike Fuller	183	9.5	N/A
Turnout		1,940	26.35	N/A
Registered electors		7,362		
Rejected ballots		10	0.5	N/A
Reform win (new seat)				
Labour win (new seat)				

Brackley (3 member)
Party	Candidate	Votes	%	±%
Reform	Richard John Butler	1,245	32.1	N/A
Reform	Andrew Last	1,194	30.8	N/A
Conservative	Fiona Baker‡	1,179	30.4	N/A
Conservative	Tony Bagot-Webb‡	1,160	29.9	N/A
Reform	William Richard Ashby	1,134	29.3	N/A
Conservative	Penny du Sautoy	860	22.2	N/A
Labour	Sue Sharps‡	844	21.8	N/A
Labour	Simon Weaver	711	18.3	N/A
Labour	Scott Langford	705	18.2	N/A
Liberal Democrats	Kate Nash	514	13.3	N/A
Liberal Democrats	Hazel Hewison	382	9.9	N/A
Green	Stewart Manley	380	9.8	N/A
Independent	Peter Rawlinson	343	8.9	N/A
Green	Ian Norman Stewart	295	7.6	N/A
Turnout		3,890	31.74	N/A
Registered electors		12,256		
Rejected ballots		15	0.4	N/A
Reform win (new seat)				
Reform win (new seat)				
Conservative win (new seat)				

Braunston & Crick (2 member)
Party	Candidate	Votes	%	±%
Liberal Democrats	Rosie Humphreys‡	1,676	43.6	N/A
Liberal Democrats	Andrew Stuart John Simpson	1,370	35.7	N/A
Reform	Sarah Goode	1,135	29.5	N/A
Reform	Kevin Vernon Wright	955	24.9	N/A
Conservative	Alan Chantler‡	845	22.0	N/A
Conservative	Stephen Christopher Kerr	698	18.2	N/A
Green	Oscar James Jobling	219	5.7	N/A
Labour	Andrew John Potts	200	5.2	N/A
Labour	Josh West	159	4.1	N/A
Independent	Ian Bradley Robertson	79	2.1	N/A
Independent	Athynea Sofia Burchall	55	1.4	N/A
Turnout		3,853	44.59	N/A
Registered electors		8,641		
Rejected ballots		12	0.3	N/A
Liberal Democrats win (new seat)				
Liberal Democrats win (new seat)				

Brixworth (1 member)
Party	Candidate	Votes	%	±%
Liberal Democrats	Jonathan Harris‡	1,131	61.0	N/A
Reform	Emille Zahiri Mehrabadi	385	20.8	N/A
Conservative	Simon Philip-Smith	235	12.7	N/A
Labour	Chris Myers	72	3.9	N/A
Green	Andrew Charles Cassidy	32	1.7	N/A
Turnout		1,855	43.39	N/A
Registered electors		4,275		
Rejected ballots		3	0.2	N/A
Liberal Democrats win (new seat)				

Campion (2 member)
Party	Candidate	Votes	%	
Conservative	Phil Bignell*	1,066	36.0	
Reform	Debra King	963	32.6	
Conservative	Adam Brown*	961	32.5	
Reform	Nicola Streeton	908	30.7	
Labour Co-op	Shirley Waterhouse	461	15.6	
Green	Anne Webb	343	11.6	
Labour Co-op	Clive Millman	295	10.0	
Liberal Democrats	Grant Lee Andrew Simpson	204	6.9	
Liberal Democrats	Nigel Alastair Strang	199	6.7	
Independent	Ray Brady	175	5.9	
Turnout		2,961	38.13	
Registered electors		7,765		
Rejected ballots		3	0.1	N/A
Conservative win (new seat)				
Reform win (new seat)				

Castle (3 member)
Party	Candidate	Votes	%	±%
Labour	Muna Cali*	924	39.1	N/A
Labour	Enam Haque‡	873	37.0	N/A
Labour	Fartun Ismail	793	33.6	N/A
Reform	Josh Heavens	525	22.2	N/A
Reform	Elliott Humphries	489	20.7	N/A
Green	Emma Poggi	482	20.4	N/A
Reform	Laura Kingsbury	412	17.5	N/A
Conservative	Wayne Baptiste	352	14.9	N/A
Conservative	Carole Thurlow	326	13.8	N/A
Liberal Democrats	Julia Borowska	312	13.2	N/A
Conservative	Roger John Thurlow	293	12.4	N/A
Independent	Connor Alan Salter	181	7.7	N/A
TUSC	Katie Simpson	136	5.8	N/A
SDP	Adrian Michael Vann	78	3.3	N/A
Turnout		2,377	18.53	N/A
Registered electors		12,829		
Rejected ballots		16	0.7	N/A
Labour win (new seat)				
Labour win (new seat)				
Labour win (new seat)				

Cogenhoe & The Houghtons (1 member)
Party	Candidate	Votes	%	
Conservative	Steve Clarke*	720	45.8	
Reform	Kevin Leslie Cross	437	27.8	
Labour	Chris Devonshire	174	11.1	
Liberal Democrats	Kerry Coupe	136	8.6	
Green	Jo Maisey	106	6.7	
Turnout		1,574	40.68	
Registered electors		3,869		
Rejected ballots		1	0.1	N/A
Conservative win (new seat)				

Dallington Spencer (3 member)
Party	Candidate	Votes	%	±%
Labour	Rufia Ashraf‡	1,087	36.7	N/A
Labour	Sally Keeble	1,035	35.0	N/A
Reform	John Alan East	966	32.6	N/A
Reform	Richard Harris	958	32.4	N/A
Reform	Maria Dreghici	954	32.2	N/A
Labour	Ryan Anthony Michlig	825	27.9	N/A
Conservative	Luke Hillery	370	12.5	N/A
Green	Jimton James	369	12.5	N/A
Conservative	Glen Hughes	352	11.9	N/A
Liberal Democrats	Michael Beardsworth	293	9.9	N/A
Conservative	Shade Ibitomisin	275	9.3	N/A
Independent	Donna Louise Bodaly	169	5.7	N/A
Heritage	Kim Elizabeth Fuller	157	5.3	N/A
Turnout		2,969	23.59	N/A
Registered electors		12,586		
Rejected ballots		8	0.3	N/A
Labour win (new seat)				
Labour win (new seat)				
Reform win (new seat)				

Daventry North East (1 member)
Party	Candidate	Votes	%	
Conservative	Peter Nigel Matten*	333	36.5	
Reform	Ashton Charles Elmes	329	36.0	
Labour	Laura Louisa Davies	130	14.2	
Liberal Democrats	John Boyden Tippett	71	7.8	
Green	Clare Patricia Slater	50	5.5	
Turnout		915	28.47	
Registered electors		3,214		
Rejected ballots		2	0.2	N/A
Conservative win (new seat)				

Daventry North West (1 member)
Party	Candidate	Votes	%	
Reform	Richard John Pipes	435	35.6	
Liberal Democrats	Alan Knape	417	34.2	
Conservative	Jake Roberts*	170	13.9	
Labour	Nigel Stephen Mercer	101	8.3	
Independent	Maria Addison	55	4.5	
Green	Sarah Stokes	43	3.5	
Turnout		1,224	30.25	
Registered electors		4,046		
Rejected ballots		3	0.2	N/A
Reform win (new seat)				

Daventry South (3 member)
Party	Candidate	Votes	%	
Reform	Anthony Jacob Lock	1,467	39.5	
Reform	Alex McMurtry	1,201	32.3	
Reform	Kama Guliyeva	1,186	31.9	
Labour	Wendy Randall‡	974	26.2	
Labour	Stephen Dabbs	776	20.9	
Independent	Dawn Lorraine Branigan	722	19.4	
Conservative	Rebecca James	718	19.3	
Conservative	Athena Fenn	674	18.1	
Conservative	Phillip Charles Nathaniel Silk-Neilsen	656	17.7	
Labour	Stuart Lauderdale	589	15.9	
Green	Kate Valerie Smallman	317	8.5	
Liberal Democrats	Julia Clark	281	7.6	
Independent	Anna Cater	273	7.4	
Liberal Democrats	John Henry Butlin	254	6.8	
Liberal Democrats	Ed Norris	228	6.1	
Turnout		3,719	28.79	
Registered electors		12,919		
Rejected ballots		5	0.1	N/A
Reform win (new seat)				
Reform win (new seat)				
Reform win (new seat)				

Deanshanger & Paulerspury (2 member)
Party	Candidate	Votes	%	±%
Independent	Ian Alexander McCord*	1,078	31.8	N/A
Reform	Ivan Dabbs	903	26.6	N/A
Conservative	Mark Hughes*	865	25.5	N/A
Labour Co-op	James Soper	859	25.3	N/A
Reform	Ryan O'Shea	806	23.8	N/A
Conservative	Luca Clifford	627	18.5	N/A
Labour Co-op	Anne Thompson	589	17.4	N/A
Green	Beverley Vivian	306	9.0	N/A
Liberal Democrats	Michael Leggett	271	8.0	N/A
Turnout		3,397	37.89	N/A
Registered electors		8,965		
Rejected ballots		4	0.1	N/A
Independent win (new seat)				
Reform win (new seat)				

Duston (3 member)
Party	Candidate	Votes	%	
Reform	Hayley Adkins	1,734	39.7	
Reform	Vincent Peter Clive	1,672	38.3	
Reform	Jasmine Rainbird	1,565	35.9	
Conservative	Matt Golby*	1,293	29.6	
Conservative	Anna King*	943	21.6	
Labour	Vikki Burgess	935	21.4	
Conservative	Paul Dyball*	933	21.4	
Labour	Daniel A Bessong	819	18.8	
Labour	Hakim Monsur	705	16.2	
Green	Shaylee Rose Tosney	607	13.9	
Liberal Democrats	Rosemary Tolley	490	11.2	
Independent	Jamie Edkins	285	6.5	
Turnout		4,390	34.48	
Registered electors		12,732		
Rejected ballots		25	0.6	N/A
Reform win (new seat)				
Reform win (new seat)				
Reform win (new seat)				

Far Cotton, Delapre & Briar Hill (3 member)
Party	Candidate	Votes	%	±%
Independent	Julie Davenport*	1,332	48.6	N/A
Reform	Anthony James Owens	807	29.5	N/A
Reform	James Richard Petter	759	27.7	N/A
Reform	Steven Christopher Reid	695	25.4	N/A
Labour	Becky Dorman	521	19.0	N/A
Labour	Robert William Parkinson	505	18.4	N/A
Conservative	Raymond Connolly*	467	17.1	N/A
Labour	Sanjeev Tiwary	359	13.1	N/A
Green	Lamarr Darrington	303	11.1	N/A
Conservative	Ray Kelly-Sargeant	284	10.4	N/A
Conservative	Sony Akie	259	9.5	N/A
Liberal Democrats	David Garlick	249	9.1	N/A
TUSC	Seamus Smyth	92	3.4	N/A
Turnout		2,747	25.72	N/A
Registered electors		10,680		
Rejected ballots		8	0.3	N/A
Independent win (new seat)				
Reform win (new seat)				
Reform win (new seat)				

Hackleton & Roade (2 member)
Party	Candidate	Votes	%	±%
Conservative	Fiona Cole*	1,095	35.0	N/A
Reform	Adam Victor Tristan Smith	1,063	33.9	N/A
Conservative	Andrew Grant*	1,030	32.9	N/A
Reform	Danny Adam Weeks	991	31.6	N/A
Liberal Democrats	Mark Allen	444	14.2	N/A
Labour	Amanda Jayne Creed	443	14.1	N/A
Labour	Joe Atkins	415	13.3	N/A
Green	Paul Michael Slater	388	12.4	N/A
Turnout		3,139	35.59	N/A
Registered electors		8,820		
Rejected ballots		7	0.2	N/A
Conservative win (new seat)				
Reform win (new seat)				

Headlands (3 member)
Party	Candidate	Votes	%	±%
Reform	Joanne Elizabeth Blythe	1,316	31.4	N/A
Reform	Adrian Cartwright	1,292	30.8	N/A
Reform	Cameron Steven Emery	1,228	29.3	N/A
Labour	Koulla Jolley‡	1,106	26.4	N/A
Labour	Turon Miah	1,060	25.3	N/A
Labour	Ellie Rutherford	1,048	25.0	N/A
Conservative	Adam Lea Smith	788	18.8	N/A
Conservative	Penny Flavell*	759	18.1	N/A
Conservative	Max Alexander Barnby	720	17.2	N/A
Green	Steve Kent	518	12.4	N/A
Independent	Paul Joyce‡	450	10.7	N/A
Liberal Democrats	Brian Markham	367	8.8	N/A
Independent	Mia Joyce	360	8.6	N/A
Liberal Democrats	David Woodbridge	349	8.3	N/A
Turnout		4,250	31.6	N/A
Registered electors		13,448		
Rejected ballots		56	1.3	N/A
Reform win (new seat)				
Reform win (new seat)				
Reform win (new seat)				

Hunsbury (3 member)
Party	Candidate	Votes	%	
Conservative	Pinder Chauhan*	1,332	33.4	
Reform	Glenn Steven Mark Butcher	1,249	31.4	
Reform	Ronald James Firman	1,184	29.7	
Conservative	Andre Gonzalez de Savage*	1,173	29.4	
Reform	Alexander Nathan Josiah Love	1,163	29.2	
Conservative	Daniel George Soan	1,163	29.2	
Liberal Democrats	Carl Squires*	874	21.9	
Liberal Democrats	Lucy Newbury	726	18.2	
Liberal Democrats	Brendan Glynane	669	16.8	
Labour	Bob Burnell	494	12.4	
Labour	Katie Evans	430	10.8	
Labour	Matthew McNicholas	382	9.6	
Green	Damon Boughen	303	7.6	
Turnout		3,988	33.79	
Registered electors		11,803		
Rejected ballots		4	0.1	N/A
Conservative win (new seat)				
Reform win (new seat)				
Reform win (new seat)				

Kingsley & Semilong (2 member)
Party	Candidate	Votes	%	
Reform	Nick Humphries	577	31.6	
Labour	Farzana Aldridge	557	30.5	
Labour	Titus Ajayi	533	29.2	
Reform	Chris Lock	533	29.2	
Conservative	Lewis Betty	278	15.2	
Green	Jason Sparkhall	228	12.5	
Conservative	Lori Gale-Rumens	213	11.7	
Green	Liam Mark Durrant	207	11.3	
Liberal Democrats	Martin Taylor	171	9.4	
Liberal Democrats	Marianne Taylor	118	6.5	
TUSC	Josh Curtis	37	2.0	
Turnout		1,836	21.36	
Registered electors		8,594		
Rejected ballots		12	0.7	N/A
Reform win (new seat)				
Labour win (new seat)				

Kingsthorpe North (3 member)
Party	Candidate	Votes	%	±%
Reform	Mark Christian Arnull	1,588	36.8	N/A
Reform	Nigel Anthony Edward Berrill	1,552	36.0	N/A
Reform	Daniel Rainbird	1,501	34.8	N/A
Liberal Democrats	Sally Beardsworth*	1,002	23.2	N/A
Conservative	Mike O'Connor	970	22.5	N/A
Conservative	Mobola Bakare	749	17.4	N/A
Conservative	Laura Stevenson*	740	17.2	N/A
Labour	Helen Barker	660	15.3	N/A
Liberal Democrats	Tom Lawler	617	14.3	N/A
Labour	Dilip Kumar	586	13.6	N/A
Green	Steve Miller	565	13.1	N/A
Liberal Democrats	Chris Leggett	533	12.4	N/A
Labour	Ersan Karaoglan	501	11.6	N/A
Green	Dave Pearson	317	7.4	N/A
Green	Paul Phoenix Powerville	243	5.6	N/A
Independent	Antony Antoniou	85	2.0	N/A
Turnout		4,323	36.87	N/A
Registered electors		11,724		
Rejected ballots		9	0.2	N/A
Reform win (new seat)				
Reform win (new seat)				
Reform win (new seat)				

Kingsthorpe South (2 member)
Party	Candidate	Votes	%	±%
Reform	Caroline Janet Phillips	658	34.0	N/A
Reform	David Gaskell	655	33.8	N/A
Labour Co-op	Harry Barrett‡	624	32.2	N/A
Labour Co-op	Eluned Lewis-Nichol	570	29.4	N/A
Conservative	Cheryl Hawes‡	324	16.7	N/A
Conservative	Sam Kilby-Shaw	259	13.4	N/A
Green	Julie Hawkins	197	10.2	N/A
Liberal Democrats	Geri Banfield	161	8.3	N/A
Liberal Democrats	Tony Woods	116	6.0	N/A
Independent	Elizabeth Kisha Anne Edwards	70	3.6	N/A
Turnout		1,942	24.1	N/A
Registered electors		8,058		
Rejected ballots		5	0.3	N/A
Reform win (new seat)				
Reform win (new seat)				

Long Buckby (2 member)
Party	Candidate	Votes	%	±%
Conservative	Daniel Lister‡	1,384	45.8	N/A
Conservative	Charles Morton	1,106	36.6	N/A
Reform	Caroline Lucy Collins	856	28.3	N/A
Reform	Neil Clayton	821	27.2	N/A
Labour	Sue Myers	540	17.9	N/A
Labour	Jane Louise Rigby	362	12.0	N/A
Green	Simon Sneddon	300	9.9	N/A
Liberal Democrats	Mark Robert Thomas	249	8.2	N/A
Liberal Democrats	Nicholas Watts	188	6.2	N/A
Turnout		3,023	41.2	N/A
Registered electors		7,338		
Rejected ballots		1	0.0	N/A
Conservative win (new seat)				
Conservative win (new seat)				

Middleton Cheney (2 member)
Party	Candidate	Votes	%	±%
Conservative	Rebecca Breese‡	1,121	36.9	N/A
Conservative	Rosie Herring‡	999	32.9	N/A
Reform	Deborah Manning	884	29.1	N/A
Reform	Victoria Markham-Beech	839	27.7	N/A
Liberal Democrats	Justin Nash	428	14.1	N/A
Green	Dave Marsden	378	12.5	N/A
Liberal Democrats	Martin Johns	318	10.5	N/A
Independent	Richard Edward Solesbury-Timms‡	316	10.4	N/A
Labour	Jane Rogers	306	10.1	N/A
Labour	Zamaani Abdullahi Alat	246	8.1	N/A
Turnout		3,044	36.14	N/A
Registered electors		8,423		
Rejected ballots		10	0.3	N/A
Conservative win (new seat)				
Conservative win (new seat)				

Moulton (3 member)
Party	Candidate	Votes	%	±%
Reform	Sue Gaskell	1,247	36.8	N/A
Reform	John Slope	1,189	35.1	N/A
Reform	Peter David York	1,182	34.9	N/A
Conservative	Daniel Cribbin‡	1,037	30.6	N/A
Conservative	John Shephard‡	903	26.6	N/A
Conservative	Mike Warren‡	837	24.7	N/A
Labour	Sally Belinda Davies	626	18.5	N/A
Labour	Stephen Francis Burnham	545	16.1	N/A
Labour	Jimmy Fawehinmi	481	14.2	N/A
Liberal Democrats	Anna Hughes	440	13.0	N/A
Green	Jamie Dexter	435	12.8	N/A
Liberal Democrats	Will Hughes	329	9.7	N/A
Liberal Democrats	Rupert Moscrop Knowles	309	9.1	N/A
Turnout		3,395	32.94	N/A
Registered electors		10,308		
Rejected ballots		4	0.1	N/A
Reform win (new seat)				
Reform win (new seat)				
Reform win (new seat)				

Naseby (1 member)
Party	Candidate	Votes	%	
Liberal Democrats	Christine Sarah Ware	672	32.4	
Conservative	Richard Auger	600	28.9	
Reform	Michael William Edwards	587	28.3	
Labour	Abigail Campbell	133	6.4	
Green	Stuart Fairlie Kendall	84	4.0	
Turnout		2,077	44.72	
Registered electors		4,644		
Rejected ballots		1	0.0	N/A
Liberal Democrats win (new seat)				

Nene Valley (3 member)
Party	Candidate	Votes	%	±%
Reform	Laura Ann Couse	1,242	36.7	N/A
Reform	Craig Morris	1,232	36.4	N/A
Reform	Trefor Hughes	1,182	35.0	N/A
Conservative	Dan Smith	918	27.2	N/A
Conservative	Phil Larratt‡	747	22.1	N/A
Conservative	Nick Sturges-Alex*	689	20.4	N/A
Labour	Peter French	666	19.7	N/A
Labour	Hilary Blackman	621	18.4	N/A
Labour	Andrew Halliwell	516	15.3	N/A
Liberal Democrats	Jill Hope	427	12.6	N/A
Green	Marianne Martin	427	12.6	N/A
Liberal Democrats	Thomas Ridley	285	8.4	N/A
Liberal Democrats	Aaryan Sharma	247	7.3	N/A
Green	Sue Pearson	246	7.3	N/A
Green	Jenny Moseley	239	7.1	N/A
Turnout		3,385	28.37	N/A
Registered electors		11,931		
Rejected ballots		5	0.1	N/A
Reform win (new seat)				
Reform win (new seat)				
Reform win (new seat)				

Parklands (1 member)
Party	Candidate	Votes	%	±%
Reform	Nigel Lawrence Stansfield	559	39.5	N/A
Conservative	Mike Hallam*	531	37.5	N/A
Labour	Jim Kellock	185	13.1	N/A
Green	Kevin Dudley Hewes	78	5.5	N/A
Liberal Democrats	Paul Anthony Schofield	63	4.4	N/A
Turnout		1,419	37.24	N/A
Registered electors		3,810		
Rejected ballots		3	0.2	N/A
Reform win (new seat)				

Rural North East (1 member)
Party	Candidate	Votes	%	
Conservative	Cecile Irving-Swift*	663	37.4	
Reform	Anthony Reynolds	450	25.4	
Liberal Democrats	Tony Nixon	420	23.7	
Labour	Nicola Bell	129	7.3	
Green	Juliet Mary Jeater	109	6.2	
Turnout		1,774	44.81	
Registered electors		3,959		
Rejected ballots		2	0.1	N/A
Conservative win (new seat)				

Rural South Northamptonshire (3 member)
Party	Candidate	Votes	%	
Conservative	Alison Eastwood*	1,985	41.7	
Conservative	Charles Manners*	1,874	39.4	
Conservative	David Smith*	1,697	35.6	
Reform	Georgie Daniels	1,481	31.1	
Reform	Stuart Harold Day	1,284	27.0	
Reform	Jonathan Sayers	1,261	26.5	
Green	Teresa Cox	885	18.6	
Liberal Democrats	Justine Michelle Leggett	813	17.1	
Labour	Jane Birch	767	16.1	
Labour	Geoff Boot	574	12.1	
Labour	Arthur Greaves	451	9.5	
Independent	Michael Nicholas Toner	238	5.0	
Turnout		4,767	40.9	
Registered electors		11,655		
Rejected ballots		5	0.1	N/A
Conservative win (new seat)				
Conservative win (new seat)				
Conservative win (new seat)				

Talavera (2 member)
Party	Candidate	Votes	%	±%
Reform	Thomas Manning	651	18.0	N/A
Reform	Scott Packer	602	16.6	N/A
Labour	Ifeoluwa Adeniran	553	15.3	N/A
Labour	Darren Ryland	485	13.4	N/A
Conservative	Monica Kelly	294	8.1	N/A
Conservative	Mariana Smith	260	7.2	N/A
Liberal Democrats	Martin Thomas Sawyer	191	5.3	N/A
Green	Michael Spence	188	5.2	N/A
TUSC	Ash Ritchie	29	0.8	N/A
Turnout		3,622	45.46	N/A
Registered electors		7,968		
Rejected ballots		6	0.2	N/A
Reform win (new seat)				
Reform win (new seat)				

Towcester (3 member)
Party	Candidate	Votes	%	±%
Liberal Democrats	David Tarbun	1,475	39.1	N/A
Liberal Democrats	Stewart Tolley	1,134	30.1	N/A
Reform	Adrian John Little	1,130	29.9	N/A
Liberal Democrats	Harry Minns	1,073	28.5	N/A
Reform	Barry Joseph Mahoney	963	25.6	N/A
Conservative	Hugh Evans	912	24.2	N/A
Reform	Scott David Zebedee	899	23.9	N/A
Conservative	Greg Lunn*	827	21.9	N/A
Conservative	Simon Clifford	734	19.5	N/A
Labour Co-op	Rachel Jean Dando L'Olive	471	12.5	N/A
Labour Co-op	Jim Mullin	452	12.0	N/A
Labour Co-op	Paul Jonathan Broadfield	371	9.8	N/A
Green	Emmie Williamson	305	8.1	N/A
Turnout		3,771	32.35	N/A
Registered electors		11,658		
Rejected ballots		3	0.1	N/A
Liberal Democrats win (new seat)				
Liberal Democrats win (new seat)				
Reform win (new seat)				

Upton (2 member)
Party	Candidate	Votes	%	
Reform	Kathryn Shaw	625	15.3	
Reform	Michael Timothy Stratton	582	14.2	
Labour	Claudette Omoye Bemigho-Amorighoye	530	12.9	
Labour	Patrick Agwue Julius	464	11.3	
Conservative	Imran Chowdhury*	430	10.5	
Conservative	Brian William Sargeant*	393	9.6	
Independent	Matthew Christopher Kinton	300	7.3	
Green	Linda Michelle Davidsen	256	6.3	
Liberal Democrats	Rona Meredith	213	5.2	
Turnout		4,102	51.4	
Registered electors		7,981		
Rejected ballots		9	0.2	N/A
Reform win (new seat)				
Reform win (new seat)				

Weston Favell & Abington Vale (2 member)
Party	Candidate	Votes	%	
Conservative	Andy Kilbride*	1,007	33.2	
Conservative	Stephen Hibbert*	980	32.3	
Labour Co-op	Clare Robertson-Mariott	834	27.5	
Reform	David Robert Lea	814	26.9	
Reform	Jordan Peter Young	764	25.2	
Labour Co-op	Jamal Alwahabi*	712	23.5	
Liberal Democrats	Alastair Stuart Thomson	294	9.7	
Green	Omonigho Jennifer Martin	244	8.1	
Turnout		3,044	37.56	
Registered electors		8,104		
Rejected ballots		14	0.5	N/A
Conservative win (new seat)				
Conservative win (new seat)				

Woodford and Weedon (2 member)
Party	Candidate	Votes	%	±%
Conservative	Rupert Frost‡	1,105	32.3	N/A
Reform	Charles Peter Hastie	1,010	29.5	N/A
Reform	Jonathan Vallis	1,003	29.3	N/A
Green	Ed Jaspers	962	28.1	N/A
Conservative	Jo Gilford‡	837	24.4	N/A
Green	Gordon Smallman	831	24.3	N/A
Labour	Les Marriott	241	7.0	N/A
Liberal Democrats	Chris Lofts	232	6.8	N/A
Labour	Stephen Tibbles	201	5.9	N/A
Liberal Democrats	Bob Symons	194	5.7	N/A
Turnout		3,433	38.96	N/A
Registered electors		8,811		
Rejected ballots		7	0.2	N/A
Conservative win (new seat)				
Reform win (new seat)				

== Aftermath ==
Following the election, Reform UK took control of West Northamptonshire Council from the Conservatives. The Conservative, Labour, and Liberal Democrat leaders were all unseated. Both Reform UK and the Liberal Democrats made gains, with Reform UK going from 0 seats (0%) to 42 (55%) and the Liberal Democrats going from 5 seats (5%) to 6 seats (8%). Both Labour and the Conservatives lost seats, with the Conservatives going from 66 (71%) seats to 17 (22%), and Labour going from 20 (22%) seats to 9 (12%). Two independents were also elected, the same number as in 2021.

Mark Arnull, previously Chair of West Northamptonshire Reform UK, was elected as the party's council group leader on 14 May 2025 and subsequently was elected as leader of the council at the Annual General Meeting of the full council on 15 May 2025. Former WNC cabinet member Dan Lister was elected Conservative leader, former MP Sally Keeble was elected Labour leader, and former deputy Liberal Democrat group leader Jonathan Harris was elected as Liberal Democrat leader.

A newly elected Reform UK councillor, Ivan Dabbs, was criticised for sharing far-right content from fascist party and hate group Britain First. Dabbs' actions were defended by the Arnull, saying he thought Dabbs' comments "got quite close to the line, but I don't believe he did cross the line". On 20 May, the Conservative, Labour, and Liberal Democrat leaders released a joint statement strongly criticising Reform UK for not taking disciplinary action on Dabbs and Ron Firman for their offensive Twitter posts. In response to Firman's comments, Arnull said that "the information on [Firman] was in the public domain and he was duly elected". The Reform UK group also stated their councillors would refuse climate training and diversity training.

== Changes 2025–2029 ==
- June 2025: Adam Smith, the Reform UK councillor for Hackleton and Roade, had the party whip suspended and was subsequently expelled from Reform UK.
- November 2025: Farzana Aldridge left Labour and joined the Liberal Democrats.
- March 2026: Kathryn Shaw and Joanne Blythe left Reform UK to sit as independents.
- March 2026: Adam Smith, who had been sitting as an independent, resigned from the council.
- September 2026: Kathryn Shaw joined the Liberal Democrats.

=== By-elections ===
==== Hackleton and Roade ====
The by-election was triggered by the resignation of Adam Smith, who had been elected for Reform UK in 2025 before the party whip was withdrawn and he was expelled, after which he sat as an independent until standing down.

Hackleton and Roade by-election, 7 May 2026
Party	Candidate	Votes	%	±%
Reform	Laura Christine Weston	1,355	30.6	−4.4
Conservative	Maggie Clubley	1,051	23.7	−12.5
Liberal Democrats	Stephen Gordon Shellabear	986	22.3	+14.7
Green	Dave Pearson	623	14.1	+7.5
Labour Co-op	Peter French	212	4.8	−9.8
Independent	Ron Johnson	203	4.6	N/A
Majority		304	6.9	N/A
Rejected ballots		6	0.1	
Turnout		4,441	50.4	+14.8
Registered electors		8,807		
Reform gain from Independent		Swing		
