= Sessions House, Northampton =

Sessions House
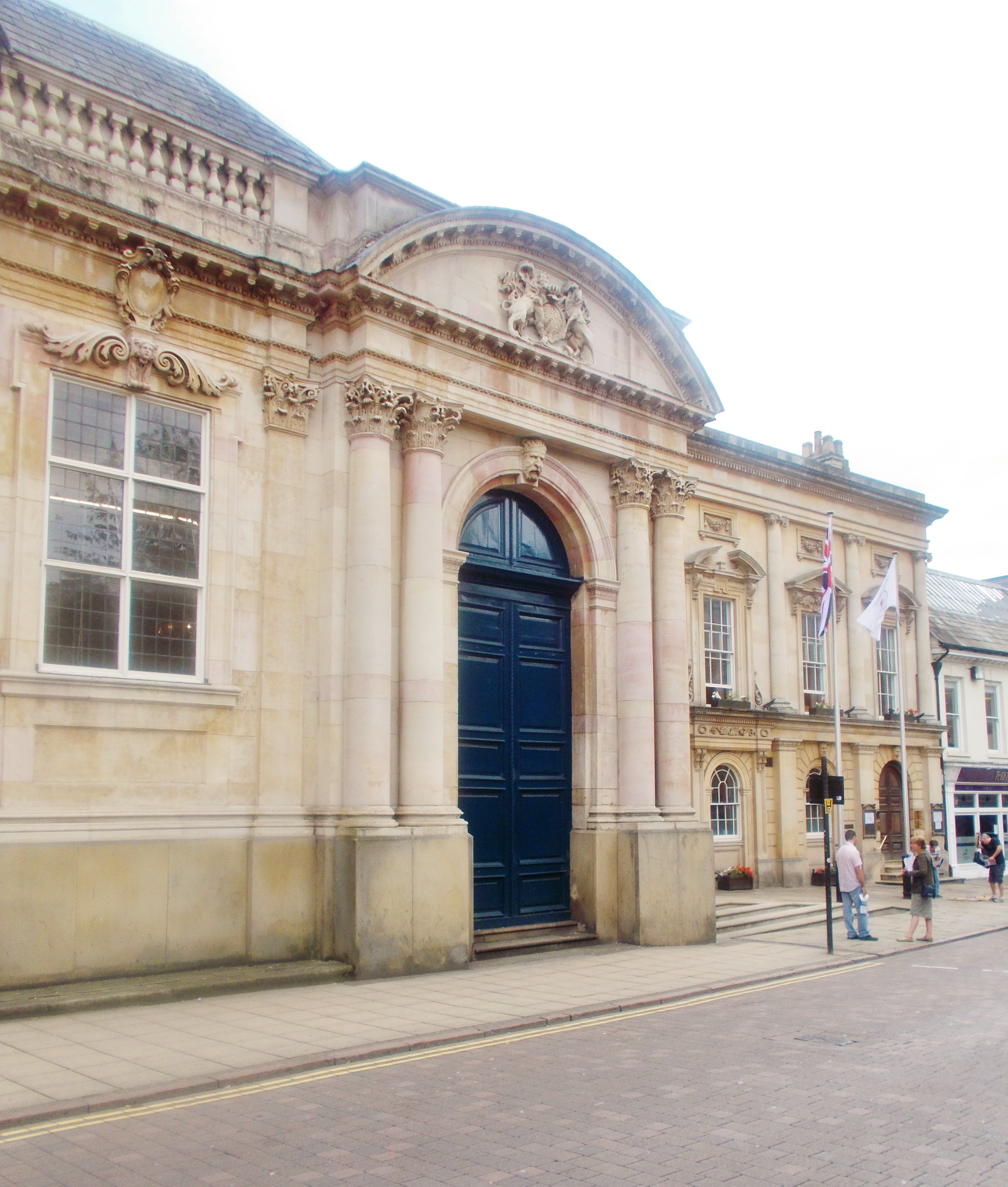
- One of the two doorways to the Sessions House

- Location within Northamptonshire
- 52.2369°N 0.8957°W
- Location: Northampton, Northamptonshire

History
- Built: 1678

Site notes
- Architect(s): Henry Bell of Kings Lynn and Sir Roger Norwich
- Architectural style: Renaissance style

Listed Building – Grade I
- Designated: 19 January 1952
- Reference no.: 1039664

The Sessions House is a former judicial building on George Row in Northampton, England. The Sessions House, which was the main courthouse for Northamptonshire, is currently used as a tourist information centre and is a Grade I listed building. The building is adjacent to County Hall, the meeting place of Northamptonshire County Council.

== History ==
The Sessions House was built on the site of an early 17th century public house known as "The Bell". The property was acquired for the county and converted into a gaol in 1634. A Quaker, John Maidwell, was imprisoned in the cells of the gaol in 1664 for not swearing allegiance to King Charles II. The gaol was destroyed in the Great Fire of Northampton in September 1675 and the Sessions House, which was designed by Henry Bell of King's Lynn in the Renaissance style using a plan by Sir Roger Norwich, became one of the first facilities built after the Great Fire when it was completed in 1678.

The design involved a symmetrical main frontage of five bays facing George Row. The central section of three bays contained windows flanked by pilasters with a central shield above the middle window. The end bays contained round headed doorways (one door for the nisi prius judge and one door for the crown judge) flanked by paired Corinthian order columns under segmental pediments containing the Royal arms. The building originally also had dormer windows and a cupola.

The principal rooms were the courtrooms: the nisi prius court was in the west of the building, stretching to the rear, and the crown court was in the east of the building. They were decorated with plaster ceilings depicting justice and the devil as well as cornucopias which were all designed by Edward Goudge. A fellow architect, Captain William Winde, said of Goudge in 1690 that he "will undoubtedly have a good deal of work for he is now looked on as the best master in England in his profession". Portraits of King William III and Queen Mary II by Wolfang William Claret were hung on the walls of the nisi prius court. The original cells from the old 17th century gaol were incorporated into the basement of the building and were accessed by staircases in the courtrooms. Prisoners sentenced to death were executed in Angel Lane, at the back of the Sessions House.

The building continued to be used as a facility for dispensing justice until 1987, when the Crown Court in Lady's Lane was completed. The Sessions House was converted for use as a tourist information centre in 2010.

== Sources ==
- Giggins, Brian (2012). Observations on the Sessions House, George Row, Northampton.
