= Northampton Crown Court =

Judicial building in Northampton, England

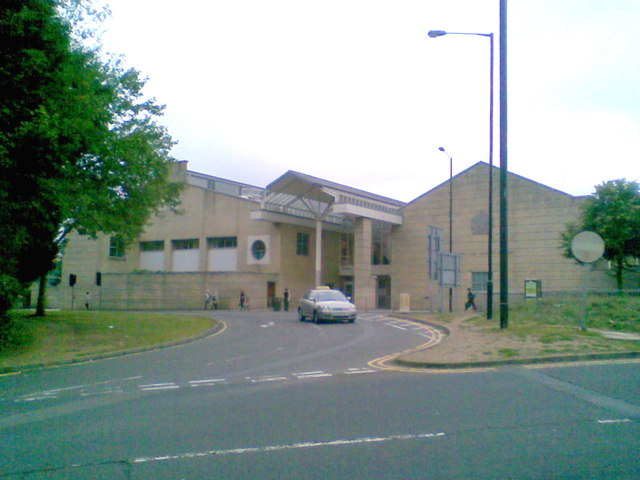
- Northampton Crown Court

- Shown in Northamptonshire
- 52.2408°N 0.8936°W
- Location: Lady's Lane, Northampton

History
- Built: 1991

Site notes
- Architectural style: Modern style

Northampton Crown Court is a Crown Court venue which deals with criminal cases at Lady's Lane in Northampton, England.

== History ==
Until the late 1980s, criminal court hearings in Northampton were held in the Sessions House. However, as the number of court cases in Northampton grew, it became necessary to commission a more substantial courthouse for criminal matters. The site selected by the Lord Chancellor's Department had accommodated a series of rows of terraced housing (Kerr Street and Park Street) before the area was cleared.

The building was designed by Kit Allsopp architects, built in buff stone at a cost of £11.5 million, and was completed in 1987. The design involved two gabled sections connected by a recessed glass atrium facing onto Lady's Lane. The right hand gabled section was fenestrated by a small square window on the ground floor and featured a prominent Royal coat of arms mounted on the brickwork at first floor level. Internally, the building was equipped with four courtrooms. The design won the Summer Exhibition Award from the Royal Academy of Arts in 1986. As a second-tier court, the complex was originally commissioned to deal solely with criminal cases, but was later remodelled to include provision for the County Court, which deals with civil cases, and the Family Court as well.

== Notable cases ==
Notable cases heard at the courthouse include:

- December 2002 – Shaied Nazir, Ahmed Ali Awan and Sarfraz Ali, sentenced to life imprisonment for the racially motivated murder of Ross Parker in Peterborough, shortly after the September 11 attacks.
- January 2004 – David Holland, former drummer with the heavy metal band, Judas Priest, sentenced to eight years for attempted rape and indecent assault against a 17-year-old male with learning difficulties.
- March 2007 – Andrew Randall, sentenced to life imprisonment for the murder and sexual abuse of his baby daughter.
- July 2009 – Murdo Mackay and Anrew Mackenzie, directors of Derby County F.C., sentenced to three years (reduced to 18 months on appeal) for fraudulently claiming "commission" for brokering a loan for the club.
- November 2013 – Anxiang Du, sentenced to life imprisonment for the 2011 murder of the Ding family.
- September 2022 – Joshua Kendall, sentenced to life imprisonment for the attempted murder of a police officer in HM Prison Onley.
