= 2021 West Northamptonshire Council election =

2021 UK local government election

- 6 May 2021

93 seats on West Northamptonshire Council 47 seats needed for a majority
- Turnout: 29.98% (▼3.4 pp) (Note: Compared with the 2017 Northamptonshire County Council election)
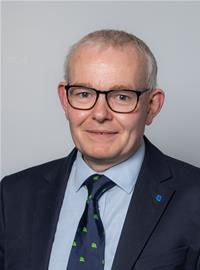

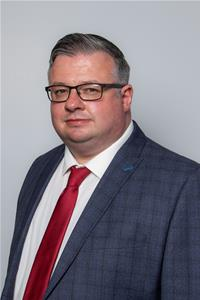

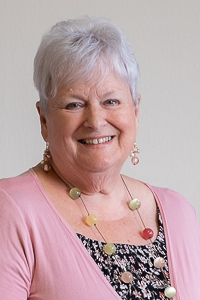
	First party	Second party
Leader	Ian McCord (Note: McCord was the Conservative Leader of the Council prior to the election. Jonathan Nunn was elected as Leader of the Council and Conservative Group leader on 13 May 2021.)	Gareth Eales
Party	Conservative	Labour
Leader since	16 April 2020	14 May 2021
Leader's seat	Deanshanger	Dallington Spencer
Seats won	66	20
Seat change	▼3	▼1
Popular vote	138,969	68,455
Percentage	50.80%	25.02%
Candidates	93	71
	Third party	Fourth party
Leader	Sally Beardsworth (Note: The Liberal Democrat group was led prior to the election by Chris Lofts, who did not seek re-election)
Party	Liberal Democrats	Independent
Leader's seat	Kingsthorpe South
Seats won	5	2
Seat change	▲2	▲2
Popular vote	43,259	7,617
Percentage	15.81%	2.78%
Candidates	59	14
- Results by ward
Council control after election
Conservative

The 2021 West Northamptonshire Council election took place on 6 May 2021, alongside nationwide local elections. The election was originally due to take place in May 2020, but was postponed due to the COVID-19 pandemic.

A total of 93 councillors were elected, with the 31 wards electing 3 councillors each. The election was held concurrently with the Northamptonshire Police, Fire and Crime Commissioner election.

== Background ==
Following the insolvency of Northamptonshire County Council, local government in Northamptonshire was reorganised, with two Unitary authorities, West Northamptonshire and North Northamptonshire, replacing the preceding County Council, and Borough and District councils. The first election to the new authorities was due to take place in May 2020, but was postponed for a year due to the impact of the COVID-19 pandemic in England.

== Campaign ==
The election was initially supposed to occur in 2020, but was postponed due to the COVID-19 pandemic.

The Conservatives launched their campaign on 30 March, declaring that the new Councils would "give everyone in Northamptonshire a fresh start." The Liberal Democrat campaign launch was delayed by the death of the Duke of Edinburgh and promised a "listening, caring and competent council."

There were several controversies during the campaign. The Conservatives were criticised for a mistake on a leaflet in Silverstone ward, which had not been adapted from the standard template. This caused embarrassment, as the stock promise was '[insert prominent local pledges here, e.g. save our libraries]' despite local anger at Conservative plans to close twenty-one libraries in the previous council. The Conservatives, in turn, criticised the Liberal Democrats for a leaflet in the style of a tabloid newspaper, though the Labour Party and the Greens both defended the leaflet. The Labour candidate for Sixfields, Graham Croucher, was expelled from the party after standing against the official Labour candidate in the Northampton Town Council election.

== Results ==
Polling was open from 07:00 until 22:00 on 6 May 2021, with the Conservative Party winning a majority of 66 of the 93 seats (71% of seats) on 51% of the overall votes. This resulted in a Gallagher index score of 16.8, meaning the council is highly disproportionate.

Seats won (outer ring) versus total number of votes (inner ring)

The turnout of the election was at 29.98%, which was suggested to be low due to the impact of the COVID-19 pandemic.

=== Summary of seats returned ===
Gains and losses calculated from nominal results of the 2017 Northamptonshire County Council election, which used the same electoral divisions.

West Northamptonshire Council Local Election Result 2021
Party	Candidates						Votes		
Party	Stood	Elected	Gained	Unseated	Net	% of total	%	No.	Net %
Conservative	93	66	3	6	▼3	70.97%	50.80%	138,969	▼0.87%
Labour	71	20	4	5	▼1	21.51%	25.02%	68,455	▼0.74%
Liberal Democrats	59	5	4	2	▲2	5.38%	15.81%	43,259	▲0.28%
Independent	14	2	2	0	▲2	2.15%	2.78%	7,617	▲2.39%
Green	19	0	0	0	0	0%	4.47%	12,236	▲2.59%
Northamptonshire Independents	1	0	0	0	0	0%	0.33%	895	▲0.58%
TUSC	5	0	0	0	0	0%	0.27%	735	▲0.28%
Reform	2	0	0	0	0	0%	0.18%	488	▲0.18%
Heritage	1	0	0	0	0	0%	0.07%	185	▲0.07%
Northampton - Save our Public Services	1	0	0	0	0	0%	0.24%	647	N/A
BNP	1	0	0	0	0	0%	0.03%	92	▲0.03%

== List of results by ward ==
=== Daventry ===
Braunston and Crick (3 seats)
Party	Candidate	Votes	%	±%
Conservative	Alan Chantler	1,821	44.6	▼5.5
Conservative	Malcolm Longley	1,646	40.3	▼9.8
Liberal Democrats	Rosie Humphreys	1,580	38.7	▲10.0
Liberal Democrats	Andrew Simpson	1,519	37.2	▲7.5
Conservative	Ian Robertson	1,450	35.5	▼14.6
Liberal Democrats	Alan Knape	1,351	33.1	▲3.4
Green	Sarah Stokes	522	12.8	N/A
Labour	Nigel Mercer	505	12.4	▼7.7
Reform	Edan James Edison	206	5.0	N/A
Turnout		4,084	41	
Conservative hold				
Conservative win (new seat)				
Liberal Democrats win (new seat)				

Brixworth (3 seats)
Party	Candidate	Votes	%	±%
Conservative	Kevin Parker	2,016	45.6	▼19.6
Liberal Democrats	Jonathan Harris	1,958	44.3	▲34.2
Conservative	Cecile Irving-Swift	1,941	43.9	▼21.3
Conservative	Richard Auger	1,869	42.3	▼22.9
Liberal Democrats	Christine Ware	1,629	36.8	▲26.7
Liberal Democrats	Tony Nixon	1,497	33.8	▲23.7
Labour	Richard Kempa	622	14.1	▼0.2
Turnout		4,423	46	
Conservative win (new seat)				
Liberal Democrats win (new seat)				
Conservative hold				

Daventry East (3 seats)
Party	Candidate	Votes	%	±%
Conservative	Peter Matten	1,321	50.1	▼11.7
Conservative	Colin Morgan	1,277	48.4	▼13.4
Conservative	David James	1,211	45.9	▼15.9
Labour	Emily Carter	840	31.8	▲0.5
Labour	Maureen Luke	735	27.9	▼3.4
Labour	Betty Ritchie	625	23.7	▼7.6
Independent	Dawn Branigan	512	19.4	N/A
Liberal Democrats	Bob Symons	349	13.2	▲6.2
Turnout		2,639	32	
Conservative win (new seat)				
Conservative win (new seat)				
Conservative win (new seat)				

Daventry West (3 seats)
Party	Candidate	Votes	%	±%
Labour	Wendy Randall	1,138	40.5	▲3.4
Conservative	Terry Gilford	1,088	38.7	▼1.2
Conservative	Lauryn Harrington-Carter	1,042	37.1	▼2.8
Labour	Stephen Dabbs	1,025	36.5	▼2.2
Conservative	Billy Butler	971	34.6	▼5.3
Labour	Ken Ritchie	895	31.9	▼6.8
Green	Gordon Smallman	318	11.3	N/A
Reform	Adam Charles Collyer	282	10.0	N/A
Liberal Democrats	Alasdair Reid	189	6.7	▼1.1
Independent	John Boyden Tippett	183	6.5	N/A
Turnout		2,808	31	
Labour gain from Conservative				
Conservative win (new seat)				
Conservative win (new seat)				

Long Buckby (3 seats)
Party	Candidate	Votes	%	±%
Conservative	Daniel Lister	2,271	54.4	▼3.2
Conservative	Philip Bignell	2,117	50.7	▼6.9
Conservative	Andrew Charles Morton	2,024	48.5	▼9.1
Labour	Chris Myers	1,168	28.0	▲6.9
Labour	Sue Myers	1,157	27.7	▲6.6
Green	Simon Sneddon	859	20.6	▲13.8
Liberal Democrats	Nigel Strang	524	12.6	▼1.9
Liberal Democrats	Neil Arthur Crispin Farmer	466	11.2	▼3.3
Liberal Democrats	William Hughes	382	9.2	▼5.3
Turnout		4,174	46	
Conservative hold				
Conservative win (new seat)				
Conservative win (new seat)				

Moulton (3 seats)
Party	Candidate	Votes	%	±%
Conservative	Daniel Cribbin	2,434	59.5	▼9.1
Conservative	Mike Warren	2,298	56.2	▼12.4
Conservative	John Shephard	2,264	55.4	▼13.2
Labour	Clare Robertson-Marriott	697	17.0	▲6.8
Labour	Joseph Atkins	683	16.7	▲6.5
Green	Simon Hall	674	16.5	▲9.6
Labour	Les Marriott	652	15.9	▲5.7
Liberal Democrats	Michael Torpy	541	13.2	▲4.4
Liberal Democrats	Rupert Moscrop Knowles	443	10.8	▲2.0
Liberal Democrats	Peter Ingles	342	8.4	▼0.4
Turnout		4,090	37	
Conservative hold				
Conservative win (new seat)				
Conservative win (new seat)				

Woodford and Weedon (3 seats)
Party	Candidate	Votes	%	±%
Conservative	Rupert Frost	2,063	57.0	▼10.4
Conservative	Jo Gilford	2,048	56.6	▼10.8
Conservative	David Smith	1,778	49.1	▼18.3
Green	Clare Slater	826	22.8	N/A
Labour	Victoria Reszeter	758	20.9	▲1.9
Liberal Democrats	Zbigniew Chetnik	525	14.5	▲0.9
Liberal Democrats	Alan Faiers	511	14.1	▲0.5
Liberal Democrats	John Butlin	349	9.6	▼4.0
Independent	Rebecca Phipps	327	9.0	N/A
Turnout		3,620	39	
Conservative hold				
Conservative win (new seat)				
Conservative win (new seat)				

=== Northampton ===
Abington and Phippsville (3 seats)
Party	Candidate	Votes	%	±%
Labour	Zoe Smith	1,652	52.1	▲3.1
Labour	Bob Purser	1,601	50.5	▲1.5
Labour	Walter-Wlodek Tarasiewicz	1,321	41.7	▼7.3
Conservative	John Joseph Schultes	833	26.3	▼1.7
Conservative	Nahar Begum	818	25.8	▼2.2
Conservative	Ifty Choudary	797	25.2	▼2.8
Liberal Democrats	Sharon Sawyer	554	17.5	▲8.3
Liberal Democrats	James Tarry	387	12.2	▲3.0
TUSC	Ashley Scott	191	6.0	N/A
Turnout		3,168	33	
Labour hold				
Labour win (new seat)				
Labour win (new seat)				

Billing and Rectory Farm (3 seats)
Party	Candidate	Votes	%	±%
Conservative	James Hill	1,515	44.9	▲1.4
Labour	Keith Delamere	1,486	44.0	▲8.3
Conservative	Paul Clark	1,474	43.7	▲0.2
Conservative	Victoria Perry	1,384	41.0	▼2.5
Labour	Dan Powis	1,159	34.3	▼1.4
Labour	Dilip Kumar	1,140	33.8	▼1.9
Liberal Democrats	Aktar Hussein	269	8.0	▲0.7
Turnout		3,375	33	
Conservative hold				
Labour gain from Conservative				
Conservative hold				

Boothville and Parklands (3 seats)
Party	Candidate	Votes	%	±%
Conservative	Mike Hallam	2,107	62.9	▼1.4
Conservative	Jamie Lane	1,660	49.6	▼14.7
Conservative	Laura Stevenson	1,575	47.0	▼17.3
Labour	Roger Ward	868	25.9	▲6.5
Labour	Christine Fitchett	849	25.4	▲6.0
Labour	Terrence Haynes-Smith	716	21.4	▲2.0
Liberal Democrats	Irene Markham	431	12.9	▲3.7
Independent	Edward Whittaker	158	4.7	N/A
BNP	Ray Beasley	92	2.7	N/A
Turnout		3,348	30	
Conservative hold				
Conservative hold				
Conservative hold				

Castle (3 seats)
Party	Candidate	Votes	%	±%
Labour	Danielle Stone	1,407	55.6	▼9.6
Labour	Jamal Alwahabi	1,300	51.4	▼13.8
Labour	Enam Haque	1,241	49.0	▼16.2
Conservative	Daniel Bell Batten	561	22.2	▼1.3
Conservative	Maqsood Ahmed Chaudhry	462	18.3	▼5.2
Green	Julie Hawkins	439	17.3	N/A
Conservative	Maroof Iftikhar	385	15.2	▼8.3
Liberal Democrats	Martin Taylor	305	12.1	▲0.8
TUSC	Katie Simpson	211	8.3	N/A
Turnout		2,531	24	
Labour hold				
Labour hold				
Labour hold				

Dallington Spencer (3 seats)
Party	Candidate	Votes	%	±%
Labour	Gareth Eales	1,405	58.5	▼7.0
Labour	Rufia Ashraf	1,230	51.2	▼14.3
Labour	Terrie Eales	1,175	48.9	▼16.6
Conservative	Victor Graham-Mole	697	29.0	▲5.5
Conservative	Aruna Patel	459	19.1	▼4.4
Conservative	Chintubhai Lalitkumar Shah	371	15.5	▼8.0
Liberal Democrats	Harry Bowden	221	9.2	▲3.4
Turnout		2,401	27	
Labour hold				
Labour win (new seat)				
Labour win (new seat)				

Delapre and Rushmere (3 seats)
Party	Candidate	Votes	%	±%
Independent	Julie Davenport	1,144	39.3	▲3.1
Conservative	Raymond Connolly	1,001	34.4	▲5.1
Labour	Emma Roberts	994	34.2	▼2.0
Conservative	Daniel Soan	894	30.7	▲1.4
Labour	Charlene Celina Craunston	841	28.9	▼7.3
Labour	Fiona Seymour	815	28.0	▼8.2
Conservative	Lesley Woolnough	644	22.1	▼7.2
Green	Paul Slater	333	11.5	N/A
Liberal Democrats	Richard Matthews	281	9.7	▼15.2
TUSC	Seamus Smyth	70	2.4	N/A
Turnout		2,908	33	
Independent gain from Labour				
Conservative win (new seat)				
Labour win (new seat)				

Duston East (3 seats)
Party	Candidate	Votes	%	±%
Conservative	Paul Dyball	1,294	39.3	▼8.3
Conservative	Nigel Hinch	1,218	37.0	▼10.6
Conservative	Greg Lunn	1,172	35.6	▼12.0
Labour	Sandie Maitland	1,142	34.7	▲2.8
Labour	Alan Kingston	1,065	32.4	▲0.5
Labour	Rob Pettitt	969	29.5	▼2.4
Independent	Barbara Walder	745	22.6	N/A
Northampton - Save our Public Services	Dave Green	647	19.7	▲3.6
Liberal Democrats	Michael Beardsworth	280	8.5	▲4.1
Heritage	Vincent Clive	185	5.6	N/A
Turnout		3,290	36	
Conservative hold				
Conservative win (new seat)				
Conservative win (new seat)				

Duston West and St Crispin (3 seats)
Party	Candidate	Votes	%	±%
Conservative	Matthew Golby	1,515	54.5	▼6.3
Conservative	Anna King	1,353	48.6	▼12.2
Conservative	Jake Roberts	1,135	40.8	▼20.0
Labour	Mike Hills	868	31.2	▲10.1
Green	Scott Mabbutt	596	21.4	▲17.0
Liberal Democrats	Julia Georgiou	529	19.0	▲12.4
Liberal Democrats	Stephen Harley	354	12.7	▲6.1
Independent	Mike Ingram	312	11.2	N/A
Turnout		2,782	36	
Conservative hold				
Conservative win (new seat)				
Conservative win (new seat)				

East Hunsbury and Shelfleys (3 seats)
Party	Candidate	Votes	%	±%
Conservative	Suresh Patel	1,923	58.3	▼1.3
Conservative	André Savage	1,878	57.0	▼2.6
Conservative	Pinder Chauhan	1,715	52.0	▼7.6
Labour Co-op	Andy Vincent	911	27.6	▲9.2
Liberal Democrats	Michael Walsh	848	25.7	▲16.9
Liberal Democrats	Paul Schofield	792	24.0	▲15.2
Turnout		3,296	33	
Conservative win (new seat)				
Conservative hold				
Conservative win (new seat)				

Headlands (3 seats)
Party	Candidate	Votes	%	±%
Labour	Paul Joyce	1,428	39.1	▲4.0
Conservative	Mark Hughes	1,136	31.1	▲1.3
Labour	Koulla Jolley	1,119	30.7	▼4.4
Conservative	Taylor Cowley-Coulton	1,109	30.4	▲0.6
Labour	Mohammed Turon Miah	1,106	30.3	▼4.8
Conservative	Mobola Bakare	1,012	27.7	▼2.1
Liberal Democrats	Martin Sawyer	657	18.0	▼5.8
Liberal Democrats	Carl Guest	481	13.2	▼10.6
Green	Steve Kent	449	12.3	N/A
Liberal Democrats	Stephen Tomlinson	438	12.0	▼11.8
Green	Mark Allenby	375	10.3	N/A
TUSC	Harrison Cairns	96	2.6	N/A
Turnout		3,648	33	
Labour hold				
Conservative gain from Labour				
Labour win (new seat)				

Kingsthorpe North (3 seats)
Party	Candidate	Votes	%	±%
Conservative	Sam Rumens	1,601	43.9	▲0.6
Conservative	Michael Brown	1,542	42.3	▼1.0
Conservative	Mohammed Aziz	1,236	33.9	▼9.4
Green	Steve Miller	1,081	29.6	▲21.9
Northamptonshire Independents	Tom Appleyard	895	24.5	▲4.9
Labour	Titus Ajayi	690	18.9	▲1.4
Labour	Lorraine Sharon Keane	669	18.3	▲0.8
Green	Paul Powerville	575	15.8	▲8.1
Green	Chris Willis	544	14.9	▲7.2
Labour	Mamun Ali	544	14.9	▼2.6
Liberal Democrats	Jon Biggs	416	11.4	▼0.5
Turnout		3,648	37	
Conservative hold				
Conservative win (new seat)				
Conservative win (new seat)				

Kingsthorpe South (3 seats)
Party	Candidate	Votes	%	±%
Liberal Democrats	Sally Beardsworth	985	35.4	▲8.8
Conservative	Cheryl Hawes	941	33.8	▲5.5
Labour	Harry Barrett	922	33.1	▼1.5
Conservative	Arthur Newbury	895	32.1	▲3.8
Labour	Rauf Khan	789	28.3	▼6.3
Labour	Fartun Ismail	708	25.4	▼9.2
Conservative	Quang Dinh	645	23.2	▼5.1
Liberal Democrats	Tony Woods	523	18.8	▼7.8
Green	Elaine Miller	450	16.2	N/A
Liberal Democrats	Stewart Tolley	435	15.6	▼11.0
Turnout		2,784	29	
Liberal Democrats win (new seat)				
Conservative win (new seat)				
Labour hold				

Nene Valley (3 seats)
Party	Candidate	Votes	%	±%
Conservative	Lizzy Bowen	1,727	55.7	▼3.2
Conservative	Jonathan Nunn	1,558	50.3	▼8.6
Conservative	Phil Larratt	1,507	48.6	▼10.3
Liberal Democrats	Leila Gilli	838	27.0	▲16.3
Labour	Samuel Isra Akbur	820	26.5	▲6.7
Green	Hilary Wilson	791	25.5	N/A
Turnout		3,100	34	
Conservative hold				
Conservative hold				
Conservative hold				

Riverside Park (3 seats)
Party	Candidate	Votes	%	±%
Conservative	Penny Flavell	2,157	54.2	▼0.9
Conservative	Andy Kilbride	2,068	52.0	▼3.1
Conservative	Stephen Hibbert	1,941	48.8	▼6.3
Labour	Rittik Roy	1,185	29.7	▲8.6
Labour	Matthew McNicholas	1,176	29.5	▲8.4
Labour	Gill Higginson	1,086	27.2	▲6.1
Liberal Democrats	David Garlick	670	16.8	▲2.1
Turnout		3,980	34	
Conservative win (new seat)				
Conservative hold				
Conservative hold				

Sixfields (3 seats)
Party	Candidate	Votes	%	±%
Conservative	Brian Sargeant	1,390	39.2	▲3.3
Conservative	Nick Sturges-Alex	1,297	36.6	▲0.7
Conservative	Imran Chowdhury	1,269	35.8	▼0.1
Labour	Graham Croucher (Note: Graham Croucher was expelled from the Labour Party after close of nominations due to standing as an independent against the official Labour candidate in the Northampton Town Council election.)	1,090	30.8	▲5.8
Labour	Karen Helm	1,044	29.5	▲4.5
Labour	Lorraine Chirisa	1,029	29.0	▲4.0
Liberal Democrats	Jill Hope	957	27.0	▼0.8
Liberal Democrats	Carl Squires	711	20.1	▼7.7
Liberal Democrats	Tom Lawler	652	18.4	▼9.4
Turnout		3,544	34	
Conservative hold				
Conservative win (new seat)				
Conservative win (new seat)				

St George (3 seats)
Party	Candidate	Votes	%	±%
Labour Co-op	Cathrine Russell	1,258	52.5	▲12.2
Labour Co-op	Muna Cali	1,030	43.0	▲2.7
Labour Co-op	Winston Strachan	954	39.8	▼0.5
Conservative	Sam Kilby-Shaw	635	26.5	▲4.2
Conservative	Lori Gale-Rumens	593	24.8	▲2.5
Conservative	Gary Austin	480	20.1	▼2.2
Liberal Democrats	Marianne Taylor	468	19.5	▼10.4
Independent	James Thorpe	349	14.6	N/A
TUSC	Dumitru Manole	167	7.0	N/A
Turnout		2,394	27	
Labour hold				
Labour win (new seat)				
Labour win (new seat)				

Talavera (3 seats)
Party	Candidate	Votes	%	±%
Liberal Democrats	Dennis Meredith	1,020	36.8	▼4.3
Labour	Janice Duffy	1,003	36.2	▲4.5
Labour	Naz Choudary	891	32.2	▲0.5
Labour	Marianne Kimani	790	28.5	▼3.2
Liberal Democrats	Rona Meredith	782	28.2	▼12.9
Conservative	Shannon Hallam	718	25.9	▲7.8
Conservative	Ash Harkara	668	24.1	▲6.0
Liberal Democrats	Brendan Glynane	618	22.3	▼18.8
Conservative	Kasia Kujawska	521	18.8	▲0.7
Turnout		2,769	28	
Liberal Democrats hold				
Labour hold				
Labour win (new seat)				

=== South Northamptonshire ===
Brackley (3 seats)
Party	Candidate	Votes	%	±%
Conservative	Fiona Baker	2,015	50.8	▼14.7
Conservative	Tony Bagot-Webb	1,698	42.8	▼22.7
Independent	Sue Sharps	1,220	30.8	N/A
Conservative	Jason Kew	1,216	30.7	▼34.8
Independent	Richard Butler	1,179	29.7	N/A
Labour Co-op	Luke Young	722	18.2	▲1.6
Labour Co-op	Zana Salipur Brittain	706	17.8	▲1.2
Independent	Arthur Rawlinson	673	17.0	N/A
Labour Co-op	Graham Judd	651	16.4	▼0.2
Liberal Democrats	Kate Nash	536	13.5	▲0.4
Turnout		3,965	34	
Conservative hold				
Conservative win (new seat)				
Independent win (new seat)				

Bugbrooke (3 seats)
Party	Candidate	Votes	%	±%
Conservative	Karen Cooper	2,405	59.1	▼10.3
Conservative	Ann Addison	2,392	58.8	▼10.6
Conservative	Adam Brown	2,293	56.4	▼13.0
Labour	Shirley Waterhouse	1,141	28.0	▲13.8
Liberal Democrats	Grant Bowles	611	15.0	▲7.3
Liberal Democrats	Stephen Deare	607	14.9	▲7.2
Liberal Democrats	Jorden Summers	574	14.1	▲6.4
Turnout		4,069	41	
Conservative win (new seat)				
Conservative win (new seat)				
Conservative hold				

Deanshanger (3 seats)
Party	Candidate	Votes	%	±%
Conservative	Ian McCord	2,031	55.5	▼12.4
Conservative	Ken Pritchard	1,967	53.8	▼14.1
Conservative	William Barter	1,846	50.5	▼17.4
Labour Co-op	Anne Thompson	959	26.2	▲7.0
Labour Co-op	Arthur Greaves	868	23.7	▲4.5
Green	Rob Bray	744	20.3	N/A
Liberal Democrats	Cliff Schraibman	677	18.5	▲5.7
Turnout		3,658	38	
Conservative hold				
Conservative win (new seat)				
Conservative hold				

Hackleton and Grange Park (3 seats)
Party	Candidate	Votes	%	±%
Conservative	Steve Clarke	2,299	57.8	▼16.2
Conservative	Fiona Cole	2,106	53.0	▼21.0
Conservative	Andrew Grant	2,021	50.8	▼23.2
Green	Katherine Chapanionek	1,087	27.3	N/A
Labour Co-op	Peter French	1,087	27.3	▲13.3
Liberal Democrats	William Tench	982	24.7	▲12.7
Turnout		3,977	39	
Conservative hold				
Conservative win (new seat)				
Conservative win (new seat)				

Middleton Cheney (3 seats)
Party	Candidate	Votes	%	±%
Conservative	Rebecca Breese	1,956	52.5	▼13.6
Conservative	Richard Solesbury-Timms	1,834	49.2	▼16.9
Conservative	Rosie Herring	1,637	43.9	▼22.2
Liberal Democrats	Mark Allen	1,293	34.7	▲25.9
Liberal Democrats	Hazel Hewison	986	26.5	▲17.7
Labour Co-op	Simon Weaver	676	18.1	▼7.9
Liberal Democrats	Justin Nash	616	16.5	▲7.7
Independent	Michael Genner	399	10.7	N/A
Independent	Joshua Phillips	216	5.8	N/A
Turnout		3,725	41	
Conservative hold				
Conservative win (new seat)				
Conservative win (new seat)				

Silverstone (3 seats)
Party	Candidate	Votes	%	±%
Conservative	Dermot Bambridge	2,755	62.0	▼9.3
Conservative	Charles Manners	2,562	57.7	▼13.6
Conservative	Alison Eastwood	2,496	56.2	▼15.1
Green	Jane Hamel	981	22.1	N/A
Liberal Democrats	Rachel James	964	21.7	▲4.9
Liberal Democrats	Max Langer	891	20.1	▲3.3
Labour	Michael Brittain	814	18.3	▲6.5
Turnout		4,441	45	
Conservative hold				
Conservative win (new seat)				
Conservative win (new seat)				

Towcester and Roade (3 seats)
Party	Candidate	Votes	%	±%
Conservative	Maggie Clubley	1,739	40.4	▼5.7
Conservative	Louisa Fowler	1,695	39.4	▼6.7
Liberal Democrats	Lisa Samiotis	1,626	37.8	▼0.7
Conservative	Miranda Wixon	1,570	36.5	▼9.6
Liberal Democrats	David Tarbun	1,511	35.1	▼3.4
Liberal Democrats	John Wade	1,328	30.9	▼7.6
Labour	Rachel Jean Dando L'Olive	632	14.7	▼0.7
Labour	David Neil Carmichael	630	14.7	▼0.7
Green	Michael James Matthews	592	13.8	N/A
Labour	Mike Caseman-Jones	583	13.6	▼1.8
Independent	Peter Jeffrey Conquest	200	4.7	N/A
Turnout		4,300	35.76	−2.66
Conservative hold				
Conservative win (new seat)				
Liberal Democrats win (new seat)				

== Changes 2021–2025 ==
- May 2021: Ian McCord was suspended from the Conservatives. He subsequently won an appeal against his expulsion but continued to sit as an independent.
- June 2023: Paul Clark left the Conservatives to sit as an independent.
- December 2023: Suresh Patel (Conservative) resigned due to ill health, with a by-election held in February 2024.
- February 2024: Carl Squires (Liberal Democrats) gained the East Hunsbury and Shelfleys seat from the Conservatives.
- April 2024: Jonathan Nunn left the Conservatives to sit as an independent following allegations of domestic abuse.
- May 2024: Richard Solesbury-Timms was listed as a member of the Independent Group.
- August 2024: Louisa Fowler left the Conservatives to sit as an independent.
- November 2024: Lizzy Bowen (Conservative) resigned due to work commitments abroad and the seat remained vacant until the 2025 election; Sue Sharps, who had been sitting as an independent, joined Labour.
- December 2024: Paul Joyce left Labour to sit as an independent after being deselected as a candidate.
- March 2025: Nigel Hinch (Conservative) resigned and the seat remained vacant until the 2025 election.

== By-elections ==
=== East Hunsbury and Shelfleys ===
East Hunsbury and Shelfleys by-election, 8 February 2024
Party	Candidate	Votes	%	±%
Liberal Democrats	Carl Squires	820	38.8	+18.5
Conservative	Daniel Soan	746	35.3	−33.1
Labour Co-op	Clare Robertson-Marriott	547	25.9	+14.6
Majority		74	3.5	N/A
Rejected ballots		8	0.4	
Turnout		2,113	23.6	−9.4
Registered electors		9,016		
Liberal Democrats gain from Conservative		Swing	25.8	

The by-election followed the resignation of Conservative councillor Suresh Patel due to ill health.
