= Ding family murders =

2014 quadruple homicide near Wootton, Northampton, England

2011 murder of the Ding family
- Photo of the Ding family
- Date: 29 April 2011
- Time: 3:00–4:00 p.m.
- Location: Wootton, Northampton, England, U.K.
- Type: Quadruple homicide
- Cause: Stabbing
- Deaths: 4
- Arrests: 3
- Accused: Anxiang Du
- Verdict: Guilty
- Convictions: Murder (4 counts)
- Sentence: Life imprisonment (mininum term of 40 years)

The 2011 murder of the Ding family occurred in Wootton, a suburb of Northampton, England, on 29th April 2011, the same day as the Royal Wedding of Prince William and Catherine Middleton. Four members of the Ding family— Jifeng "Jeff" Ding, his wife Helen Chui and their daughters Xing and Alice—were found murdered at their home in Wootton at 6:00 pm on Sunday, 1 May 2011. They were thought to have been murdered two days earlier between about 3:00 pm and 4:00 pm on Friday, 29 April 2011.

Northamptonshire Police named Anxiang Du, a businessman from Coventry who had been involved in a legal dispute with the Ding family, as the prime suspect in the case. Du fled the murder scene in the Ding's rented car; he drove to London and travelled to Paris by coach. He continued through France, Spain and finally to Morocco, prompting a worldwide manhunt. He lived in a partly built block of flats for 14 months before he was arrested and extradited to the UK.

Du was tried at Northampton Crown Court in November 2013. He was found guilty of the murders and was sentenced to life imprisonment with a minimum term of 40 years.

== Background ==
The Ding family were of Chinese descent: Jifeng "Jeff" Ding, his wife Helen Chui and their two daughters Xing (aged 18) and Alice (aged 12). Alice and Xing were talented musicians. Xing had excelled in school and 'has now been awarded four posthumous A* grades [at A-level] in Chemistry, Classic Latin, Mathematics and Biology, after the exams boards used her existing work to predict the grades she would have achieved'. She had already accepted an offer from the University of Nottingham to study medicine in the autumn.

They were all stabbed to death at their home in Pioneer Close, part of the re-developed Royal Pioneer Corps' Simpson Barracks in Wootton, a modern, middle-class suburb of Northampton just over 2 miles (3.2 km) south of the town centre.

Anxiang Du was a businessman who had run a Chinese herbal remedy shop in Birmingham with the Dings. Since 1999, he and his wife had been engaged in a ten-year legal dispute with the Dings after their partnership failed. He faced a legal bill of around £88,000 after losing his final appeals. On 28 April 2011, Du was served with a court order preventing him from disposing of his assets.

== Timeline ==
At 10:44 am on 29 April 2011, Anxiang Du boarded a train from Coventry to Birmingham, carrying a knife and his passport, after leaving his family a farewell note. He boarded another train in Birmingham and travelled to Northampton. From Northampton town centre, Du travelled by bus to Wootton, arriving there at around 1:35 pm.

Du killed the Ding family around two hours later at around 3:30 pm. The murders took place at the Dings' house at 10 Pioneer Close, Wootton Fields. Du stabbed Jeff and Helen Ding to death in their kitchen before going upstairs to find the two girls, Xing and Alice, in a bedroom. Du stabbed Jeff 23 times, Helen 13 times, Xing 11 times and Alice 4 times. During the attacks a 999 call, during which the screams of both girls could be heard, was made from Alice Ding's mobile telephone at 3:32 pm. The call was mishandled by Northamptonshire Police, which sent officers to a different address. The call was considered closed when nothing was found there. Du stole the family's Vauxhall Corsa; at 9:43 pm that evening he stopped at junction 15a services on the M1 motorway where he bought a map of Northamptonshire. He tried to call upon another former business partner who lived in the county, but he was not at home. From there, Du drove to London. As the car entered the capital, automatic number plate recognition cameras failed to detect the car. He abandoned the Dings' car in St. John's Wood, where it remained for eleven days and accrued nine parking tickets.

On 30 April, Du bought a one-way coach ticket to Paris using his own passport. Sometime that day, his wife reported him missing. On 1 May, at 8:00 am, police called at the Dings' house looking for Du, but left when nobody answered the door. The Dings' bodies were discovered by a neighbour later that day. Du travelled through France and Spain, and took a ferry from Algeciras to Tangier in Morocco. He travelled onwards to Oujda near the border with Algeria, where he was arrested as a suspected illegal immigrant. Moroccan police released him because they could not determine his identity and were unaware that he was wanted in the UK.

Du remained in Morocco for a further 14 months; in mid-2012, Northamptonshire Police announced they believed he was in that country. A photograph of Du was printed in a local newspaper and a construction worker recognised him. A man believed to be Du was found living in a partly built block of flats where he slept on a makeshift bed and cooked food on a small gas-powered stove. He was arrested on 7 July 2012. Police officers visited Madrid and believe their inquiries there "played a significant part in the suspect's apprehension". Officers made a formal application for extradition with the Home Office, although there was no formal extradition arrangement with Morocco.

On 10 July 2012, it was confirmed that the arrested man was chief suspect Anxiang Du. On 19 July 2012, a 54-year-old woman in Coventry, a woman aged 39 in Gloucester, a 22-year-old woman in Southend and a man aged 25 in London were arrested. They were all held on suspicion of conspiracy to assist an offender and were bailed until a later date.

=== Extradition and trial ===
On 20 February 2013, Anxiang Du was extradited to the UK with the approval of the Moroccan Ministry of Justice working with the British Home Office. Du appeared in the Magistrates' court at Northampton on 21 February 2013 and was charged with the murders of the Ding family. He was remanded in custody and appeared at Northampton Crown Court the following day. A provisional trial date was set for 5 August 2013 and was expected to last 10 days. Du was next due to appear in Northampton Crown Court on 7 May 2013 for a plea and case management hearing. This was moved to Nottingham on 10 May 2013. It was later reported that the trial date could be changed to 29 July 2013 following information on the availability of experts. However, when Du made his plea and case management hearing on 10 May 2013, a Mandarin interpreter failed to arrive at the court. The plea and case management hearing was then re-set for July with a trial due to begin on 12 November 2013.

On 18 July 2013 Du appeared at Northampton Crown Court but only spoke to confirm his name. No plea could be heard at the hearing as tests were still being conducted. He was expected to appear before the court again on 17 October to enter a plea but this was postponed until 4 November when Du denied four counts of murder. The trial started on 12 November 2013. The jury was sent out to consider its verdict on 26 November and returned to court around midday on 27 November finding Du guilty of the murder of the four members of the Ding family. On 28 November 2013 Du, aged 54 at the time, was sentenced to life imprisonment with a minimum term of 40 years. In June 2014 it was reported that Du was to appeal his minimum 40-year term. The appeal was rejected with the statement that the trial judge's approach could not be faulted and that even more draconian whole-life tariffs had been upheld in other cases of whole families being murdered – including that of Jeremy Bamber.

== See also ==
- Pottery Cottage murders
