= County Hall, Northampton =

County building in Northampton, Northamptonshire, England

County Hall
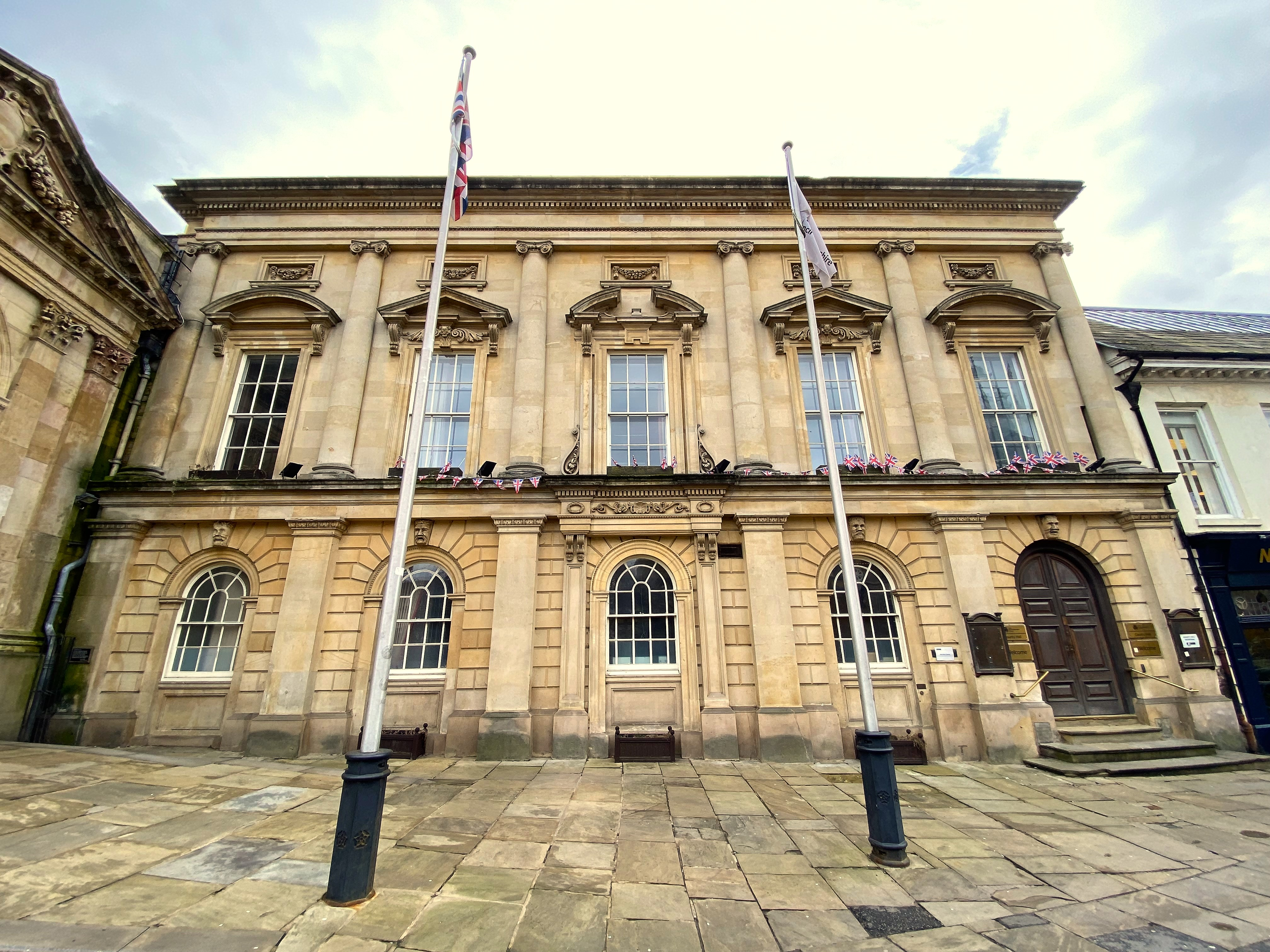
- County Hall

- Location within Northamptonshire
- 52.2368°N 0.8959°W
- Location: Northampton, Northamptonshire

History
- Built: 1845

Site notes
- Architect: James Milne

Listed Building – Grade II*
- Designated: 9 December 1968
- Reference no.: 1039665

The County Hall is a municipal facility on George Row in Northampton, Northamptonshire, England, which was the headquarters of Northamptonshire County Council until it was dissolved in 2021. It is a Grade II* listed building. The building is adjacent to the former Sessions House which is now used as a Tourist Information Centre.

== History ==
The building is an 18th-century house which was rebuilt to a design by James Milne in 1845. Following the implementation of the Local Government Act 1888, which established county councils in every county, it became the meeting place of Northamptonshire County Council. It was remodelled to a design by Edmund Law to accommodate a council chamber in 1890 and further altered to a design by Sir Aston Webb to create more meeting rooms in 1900.

The design involved a symmetrical main frontage of five bays facing George Row; the four left hand bays contained round headed sash windows and right hand bay featured a wooden doorway; each of the bays was flanked by Tuscan order pilasters on the ground floor; there were five sash windows with alternating segmental and triangular pediments flanked by Ionic order half columns on the first floor. The principal rooms were the council chamber and a reception room known as the "Octagon room".

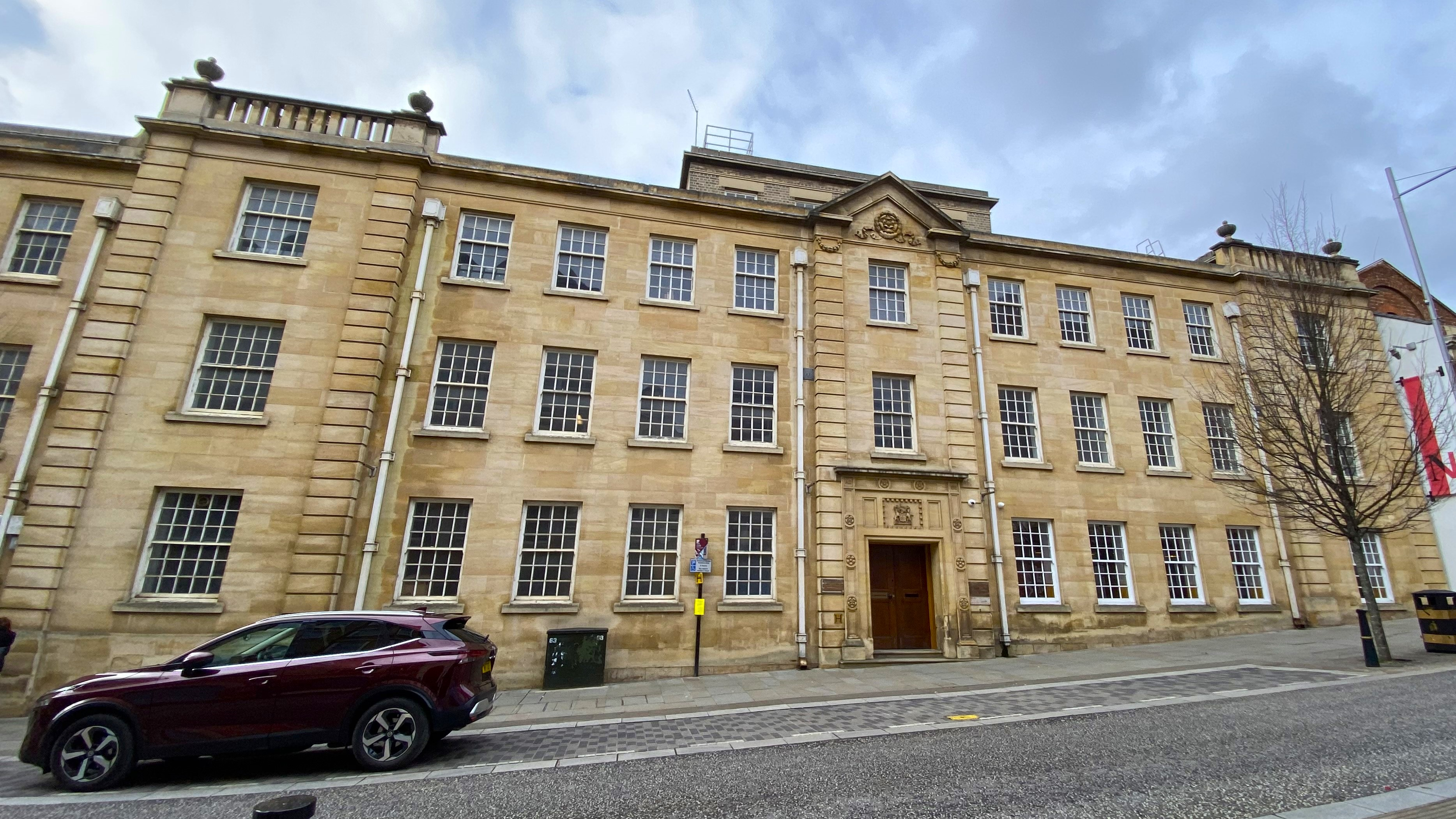
24 Guildhall Road, built in 1939 as County Offices.

As the county council's responsibilities grew, it needed more office space than was available in County Hall. It acquired a former jail (built 1791–1794) immediately south-east of the Sessions Room and County Hall, and converted that to be offices. In 1939 the council built a large neo-Georgian office building to the east of the old jail, linked to the older buildings by corridors to the rear. The new building was called County Offices and had its main frontage onto Guildhall Road. It was designed by the county architect, George Henry Lewin, and was faced in Ketton stone. The county council was granted a coat of arms whilst the building was under construction, and the arms were carved into the stonework above the main doorway. The outbreak of the Second World War meant that no official opening ceremony was held for the County Offices.

The county council's administrative responsibilities continued to grow, and by the early 21st century its offices were spread across some twelve buildings around the town. In 2013, it decided to procure a single administration centre in which council officers and their departments would be co-located on a derelict site just south of County Hall. The new building was named "One Angel Square". The building was designed by BDP, built by Galliford Try at a cost of £53 million and officially opened by the Secretary of State for Housing, Communities and Local Government, Sajid Javid, in October 2017. The county council subsequently announced the sale and lease back of One Angel Square to Canada Life Investments, in order to raise funds for the provision of services, in February 2018.

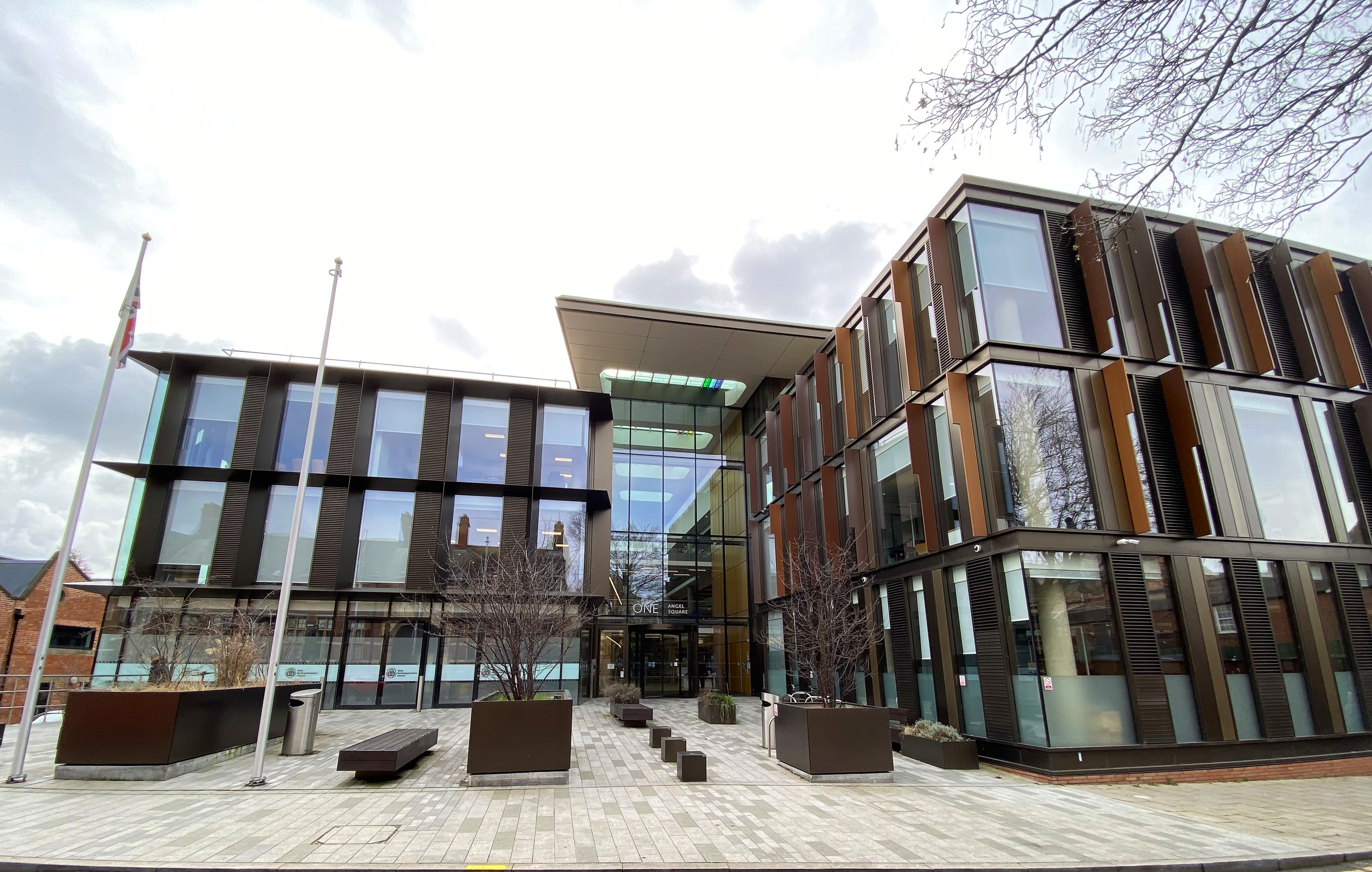
One Angel Square, 4 Angel Street, Northampton

The county council announced in June 2018 that it was considering selling County Hall but the proposed transaction was subsequently abandoned. The county council continued to use the council chamber at County Hall for meetings until the council was abolished in March 2021.
