= Northamptonshire County Council =

Former local authority in England

Type
- Type: Non-metropolitan county council

History
- Founded: 1 April 1889
- Disbanded: 31 March 2021

Elections
- Last election: 4 May 2017

Meeting place
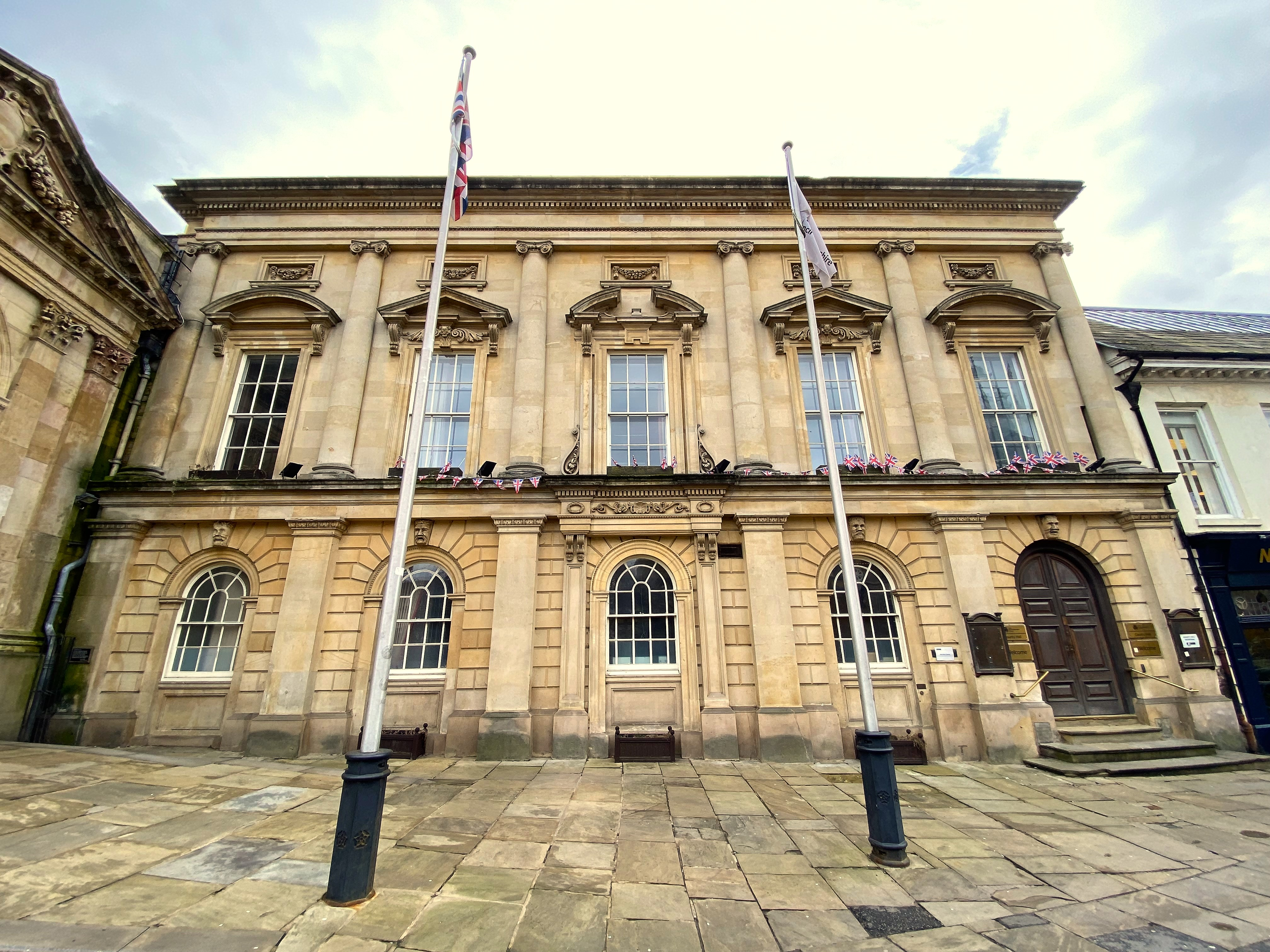
- County Hall, Northampton

Northamptonshire County Council was the county council for Northamptonshire in England from 1889 to 2021. It was originally created in 1889, reformed in 1974, and abolished in 2021. The headquarters of the council was County Hall in Northampton.

Following the 1974 reforms Northamptonshire was classed as a non-metropolitan county, and the county council was responsible for education, social services, libraries, main roads, public transport policy and fire services, trading standards, waste disposal and strategic planning.

In early 2018, the council announced it was effectively insolvent. Subsequently, a report by government inspectors concluded that problems at the council were so deep-rooted that it should be abolished and replaced by two smaller authorities. Northamptonshire County Council and the county's seven district councils were therefore abolished, being replaced by two new unitary authorities called North Northamptonshire Council and West Northamptonshire Council in 2021.

== History ==
Elected county councils were created in 1889 under the Local Government Act 1888, taking over administrative functions which had previously been performed by unelected magistrates at the quarter sessions. In Northamptonshire, the quarter sessions for the hundred of Nassaburgh in the north-east of the county had been held separately from those of the rest of the county since the 14th century. Nassaburgh was a liberty under the control of the Abbot of Peterborough and so also became known as the Soke of Peterborough. Its administrative independence from the rest of Northamptonshire was maintained in 1889 by being given its own Soke of Peterborough County Council, although it remained part of the geographical county of Northamptonshire for the purposes of lieutenancy.

The borough of Northampton was considered large enough for its existing borough council to provide county-level services, and so it was made a county borough, independent from the county council. The 1888 Act also directed that urban sanitary districts which straddled county boundaries were to be placed entirely in one county, which saw Northamptonshire cede its part of Market Harborough to Leicestershire and its part of Banbury to Oxfordshire. Northamptonshire County Council was elected by and provided services to the parts of the county (as thus adjusted) outside the Soke of Peterborough and county borough of Northampton. The county council's area was termed the administrative county.

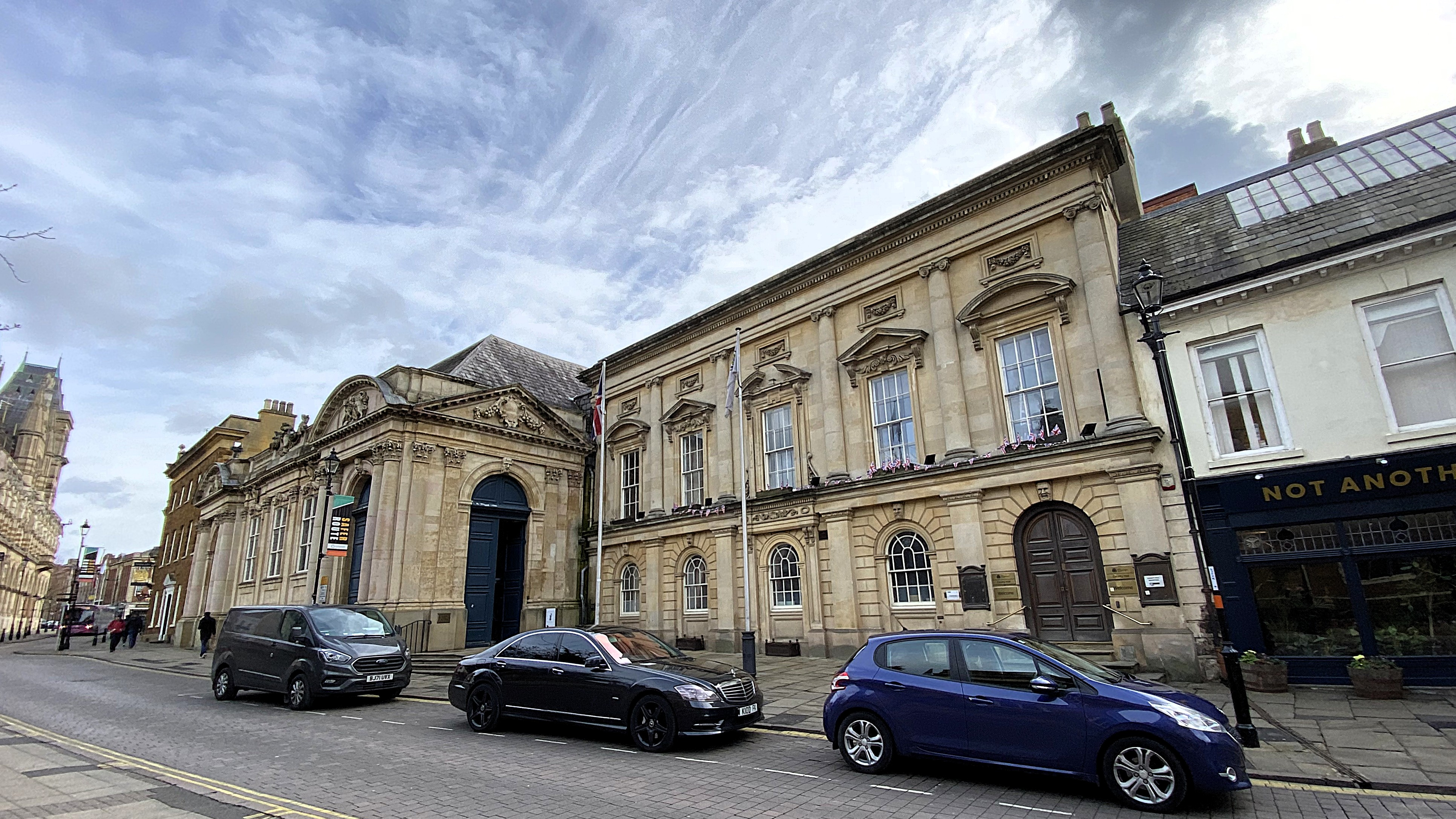
Sessions House (left) and County Hall (right), George Row, Northampton

The first elections were held in January 1889, and the county council formally came into being on 1 April 1889. On that day it held its first official meeting at the Sessions House in Northampton, the courthouse (completed 1678) which had served as the meeting place for the quarter sessions which preceded the county council. The first chairman of the council was John Spencer, 5th Earl Spencer, a Liberal peer, who had also been Lord Lieutenant of Northamptonshire since 1872. Finding the courtroom at the Sessions House was poorly suited for council meetings, the council shortly afterwards had a new council chamber built to the rear of the adjoining house to the west; the new chamber was completed in 1890 and the complex of buildings became known as County Hall.

Local government was reformed in 1974 under the Local Government Act 1972. Northamptonshire was reclassified as a non-metropolitan county, and the borough of Northampton was brought under the authority of the reformed county council. (Note: The Soke of Peterborough had lost its ceremonial link with Northamptonshire in 1965 when it was absorbed into the short-lived county of Huntingdon and Peterborough, which was in turn absorbed into Cambridgeshire in 1974.) The lower tier of local government was reorganised as part of the same reforms. Previously it had comprised numerous boroughs, urban districts and rural districts; they were reorganised into seven non-metropolitan districts.

During the 1990s local government reform, Northampton tried to obtain unitary authority status, but failed.

=== Insolvency ===
Early in 2018 the county council announced that it "was effectively insolvent." In March 2018, a government-appointed investigator's recommended the council be broken up. It said the financial and management problems at the council were so deep-rooted that it was impossible to rescue it in its current form. The report rejected the council leadership's claim that it had been disadvantaged by government funding cuts and underfunded. It condemned the council's attempt to restructure services by outsourcing them to private companies and charities (the Next Generation Programme). It described the council's budgeting as "an exercise of hope rather than expectation".

Subsequently, the leader of the council, Heather Smith, resigned. Robin Brown, the lead councillor for finance, was later sacked. The government appointed external commissioners to oversee the running of the council in May 2018.

Significant cuts were made to the council's spending, trying to overcome a funding shortfall of £70m from the council's £441m budget in 2018. The cuts were controversial; those affecting the library service were successfully challenged in court. The cuts were also reported to cause hardship to some families with special needs.

Different commentators had different views about the extent to which the council's financial problems were of its own making or attributable to the United Kingdom government austerity programme. Simon Butler, writing in The Guardian, described "a reckless half-decade in which it refused to raise council tax to pay for the soaring costs of social care, preferring to patch up budget holes with accounting ruses and inappropriate use of financial reserves". Simon Edwards of the County Councils Network, commented "It is clear that, partly due to past failings, the council is now having to make some drastic decisions to reduce services to a core offer. However, we can’t ignore that some of the underlying causes of the challenges facing Northamptonshire, such as dramatic reductions to council budgets and severe demand for services, mean county authorities across the country face funding pressures of £3.2bn over the next two years." Andrew Gwynne, then the Labour shadow secretary of state for communities and local government, said "Government cuts are pushing our councils into crisis, and the crisis in Northamptonshire is the canary in the coal mine. Despite one of their own councils effectively declaring themselves bankrupt twice this year, we have yet to see [the] government recognise the appalling consequences of their austerity programme for people up and down the country".

In January 2019 the Secretary of State for Housing, Communities and Local Government gave the council permission to raise its council tax by 5% in 2019–20 without the requirement for a local referendum.

In June 2019, the county council's children's services were rated "inadequate" by Ofsted inspectors. The report found that there were "highly vulnerable children in care who are living in unregulated placements that are unsafe and unsuitable". Earlier in the same month, two serious case reviews found that council's child protection services had failed to protect two murdered children.

In April 2019, the government confirmed that the county council and the county's seven district councils would all be abolished and replaced with two unitary authorities. The new areas were named North Northamptonshire (covering the abolished districts of Corby, East Northamptonshire, Kettering, and Wellingborough) and West Northamptonshire (covering Daventry, Northampton, and South Northamptonshire). The county council's last day was 31 March 2021, and the new authorities formally came into being on 1 April 2021.

== Governance ==
Northamptonshire districts and boroughs 1974–2021
1 South Northamptonshire
2 Northampton
3 Daventry
4 Wellingborough
5 Kettering
6 Corby
7 East Northamptonshire

Northamptonshire County Council provided county-level functions. After the 1974 reforms, district-level functions were provided by the county's seven district councils (some of which were styled as boroughs, allowing them to have a mayor):

- Corby Borough Council
- Daventry District Council
- East Northamptonshire District Council
- Kettering Borough Council
- Northampton Borough Council
- South Northamptonshire District Council
- Borough Council of Wellingborough

Much of the county was also covered by civil parishes, which formed a third tier of local government for their areas.

== Political control ==
Political control of the council from the 1974 reforms until its abolition in 2021 was as follows:

Party in control	Years
Labour	1974–1977
Conservative	1977–1981
No overall control	1981–1993
Labour	1993–2005
Conservative	2005–2021

=== Leadership ===
The leaders of the council from 1977 until the council's abolition in 2021 were:

Councillor	Party	From	To
John Lowther	Conservative	1977	1981
Jimmy Kane	Labour	1981	1984
Bill Morton	Conservative	1984	May 1991
John Ewart	Conservative	May 1991	May 1993
Jimmy Kane	Labour	May 1993	May 1998
Mick Young	Labour	May 1998	2005
Jim Harker	Conservative	2005	May 2016
Heather Smith	Conservative	May 2016	15 Mar 2018
Matthew Golby	Conservative	12 Apr 2018	31 Mar 2021

== Premises ==
Having held its first few meetings at the Sessions House before building a new council chamber at the adjoining house which became County Hall in 1890, the council then used County Hall as its meeting place until its abolition in 2021.

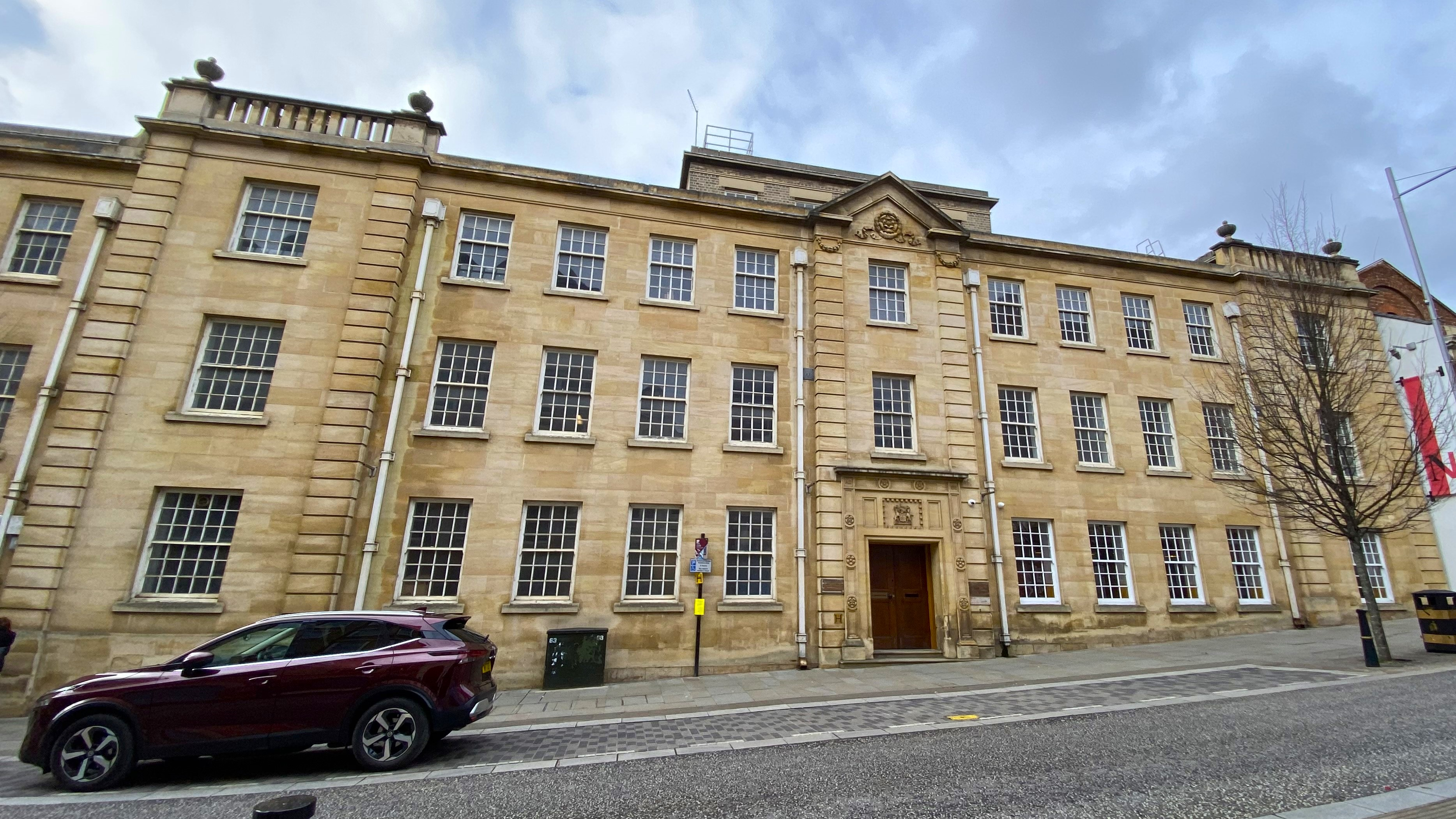
24 Guildhall Road, built in 1939 as County Offices.

As the county council's responsibilities grew, it needed more office space than was available in the converted house which formed the main part of County Hall. The council acquired a former gaol (built 1791–1794) immediately south-east of the Sessions Room and County Hall, and converted that to be offices. In 1939 the council built a large neo-Georgian office building to the east of the old gaol, linked to the older buildings by corridors to the rear. The new building was called County Offices and had its main frontage onto Guildhall Road.

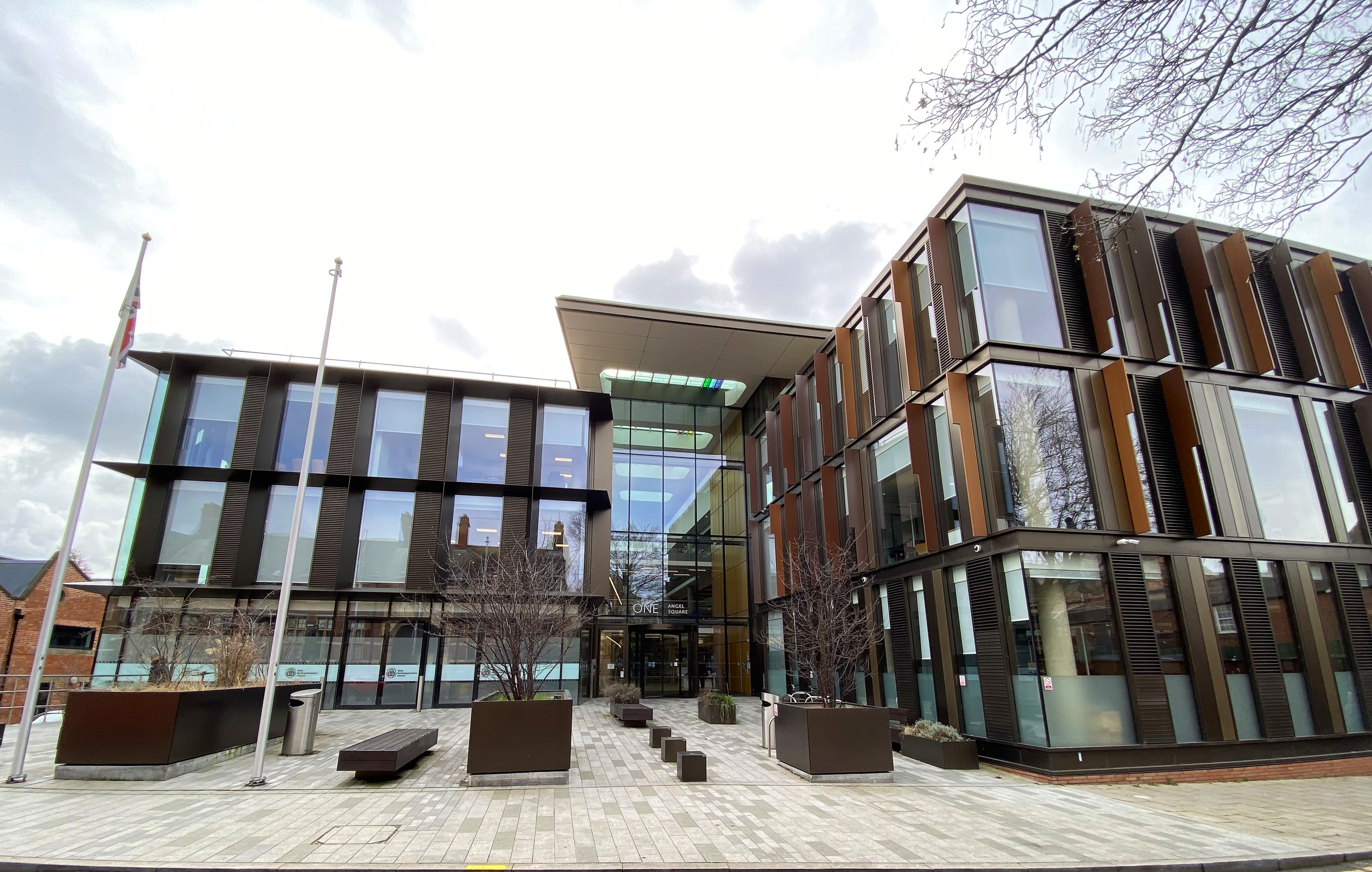
One Angel Square, 4 Angel Street, Northampton

The county council's administrative responsibilities continued to grow, and by the early 21st century its offices were spread across some twelve buildings around Northampton. In 2013, it decided to build a single building in which council officers would be based on Angel Street, immediately south of County Hall. The new building was named "One Angel Square". The building cost £53m and was officially opened by the Secretary of State for Housing, Communities and Local Government, Sajid Javid, in October 2017, a few months before the extent of the council's financial problems was made public. The county council subsequently announced the sale and lease back of One Angel Square to Canada Life Investments, in order to raise funds for the provision of services, in February 2018.

== See also ==
- 2019 structural changes to local government in England
