= West Northamptonshire Council =

Local authority in Northamptonshire, England

- Coat of Arms of West Northamptonshire Council

- Logo of West Northamptonshire Council

Type
- Type: Unitary authority

Leadership
- Chair: Fiona Baker, Conservative since 21 May 2026
- Leader: Mark Arnull, Reform UK since 15 May 2025
- Chief Executive: Martin Henry since December 2025

Structure
- Seats: 76 councillors
- Political groups: Administration (39) Reform (39) Other parties (37) Conservative (17) Labour (8) Liberal Democrats (8) Restore (2) Independent (2)

Elections
- Last election: 1 May 2025
- Next election: 3 May 2029

Meeting place
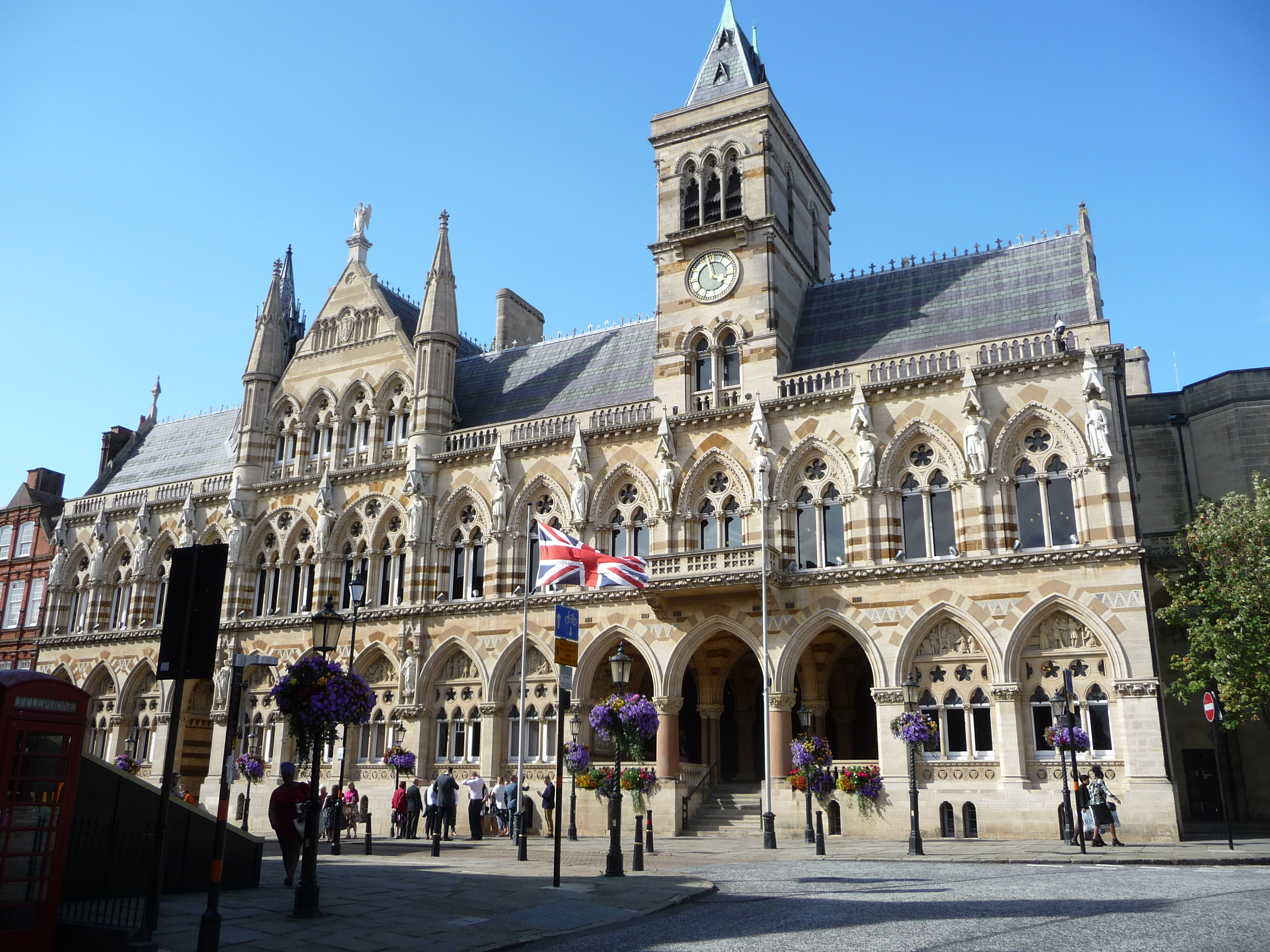
- The Guildhall, St Giles Square, Northampton, NN1 1DE

Website
- westnorthants.gov.uk

West Northamptonshire Council is the local authority for West Northamptonshire, a local government district in the ceremonial county of Northamptonshire, England. It is a unitary authority, being a district council which also performs the functions of a county council. The council has been under Reform UK majority control since the 2025 election. Full council meetings are generally held at Northampton Guildhall, and the council's main offices are at One Angel Square in Northampton.

== History ==
The council was created in 2021. It took over the functions of the three abolished district councils of Daventry District Council, Northampton Borough Council, and South Northamptonshire District Council, as well as the functions of the abolished Northamptonshire County Council within the area.

== Governance ==
Legally, West Northamptonshire Council is a district council which also performs the functions of a county council, making it a unitary authority. Some county-wide functions, such as the Northamptonshire Fire and Rescue Service, are overseen by joint committees of West Northamptonshire Council and North Northamptonshire Council, the other unitary authority in the county.

The whole area is also covered by civil parishes, which form a second tier of local government.

== Political control ==
Since the 2025 election, Reform UK have held a majority of the seats on the council:

Party in control	Years
Conservative	2021–2025
Reform	2025–present

== Leadership ==
The leader of the council from its first meeting following its creation in 2021 was Jonathan Nunn, who was the last leader of the old Northampton Borough Council. Ian McCord, outgoing Conservative leader of the old South Northamptonshire District Council, had served as leader of the shadow authority set up to oversee the transition to the new arrangements.

Councillor	Party	From	To
Jonathan Nunn	Conservative	20 May 2021	18 April 2024
Adam Brown	Conservative	16 May 2024	May 2025
Mark Arnull	Reform	15 May 2025	

The councils Chief Executive is the councils Head of Paid Service. The list of Councils Chief Executives is as follows;

Chief Executive	From	To
Anna Earnshaw	April 2021	November 2025
Martin Henry (Interim)	November 2025	August 2026
Martin Henry	August 2026	

== Composition ==
Following the 2025 election, and subsequent changes up to July 2026, the composition of the council was:

Party	Councillors
Reform	39
Conservative	17
Labour	8
Liberal Democrats	8
Restore	2
Independent	2
Total	76

The next election is due in 2029.

== Elections ==
Elections for a shadow authority were due to be held on Thursday 7 May 2020 but were postponed until 6 May 2021 due to the COVID-19 pandemic. Since the last boundary changes in 2025, the council has comprised 76 councillors representing 35 wards, each electing one, two or three councillors. Elections are held every four years.

== Premises ==
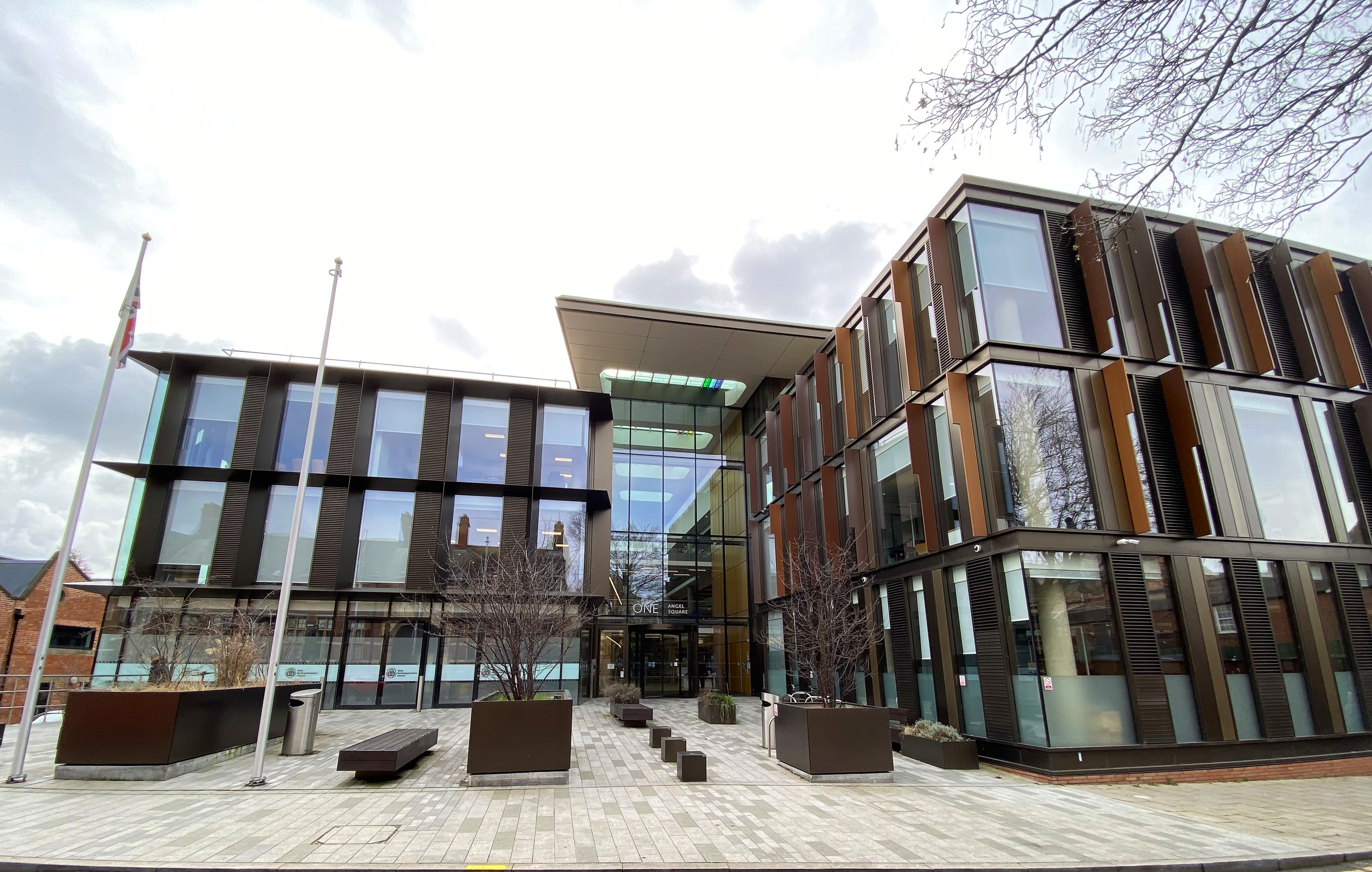
One Angel Square, 4 Angel Street, Northampton, NN1 1ED: Council's main offices

Full council meetings are generally held at Northampton Guildhall, with the nearby former Northamptonshire County Council offices at One Angel Square serving as the council's headquarters.

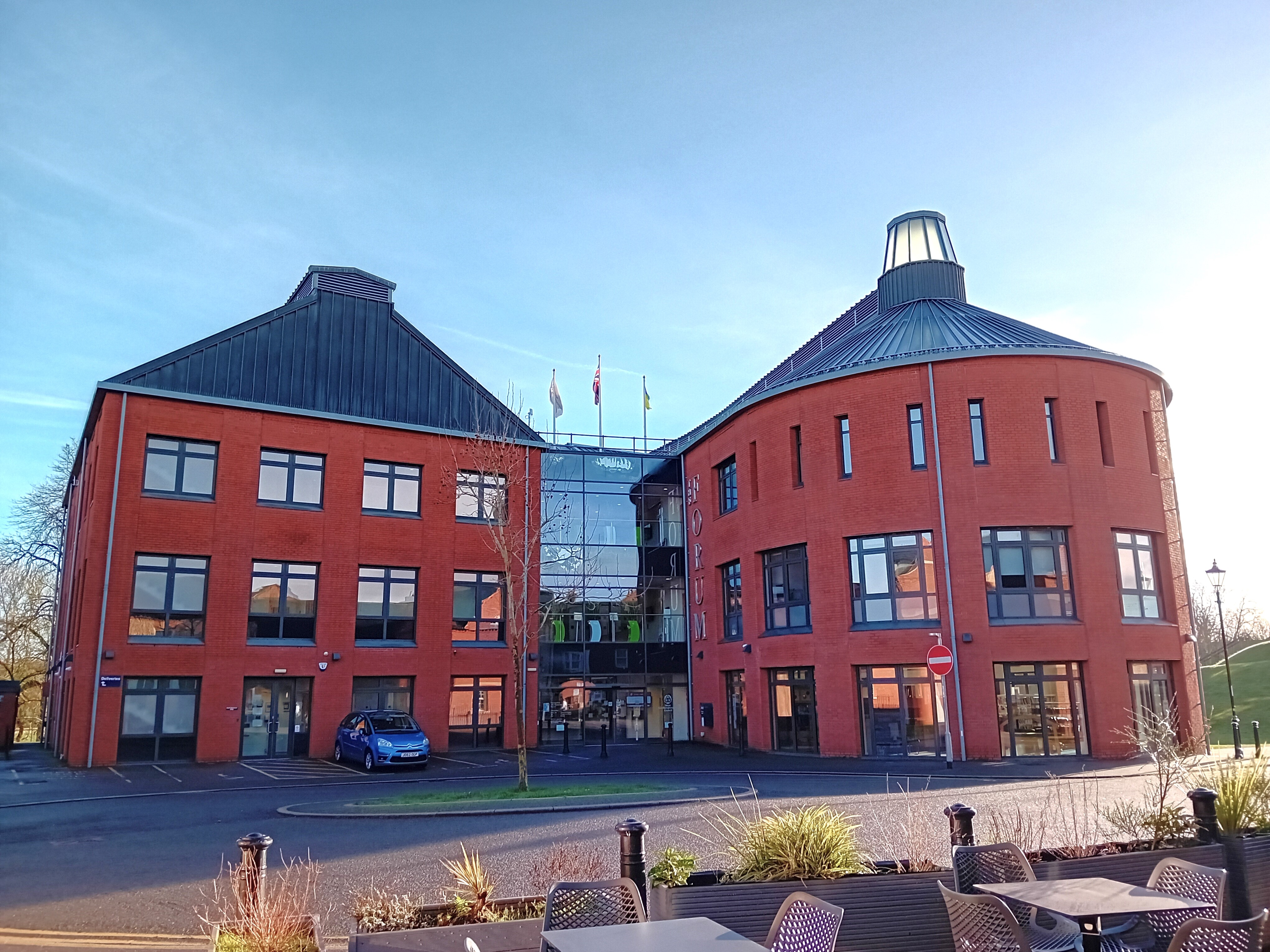
The Forum, Towcester

The council also inherited offices at The Forum in Towcester from South Northamptonshire District Council and Lodge Road in Daventry from Daventry District Council. The Forum continues to be used as additional offices and for some committee meetings, whilst Lodge Road has closed, being replaced by a smaller area office in Daventry.

== Arms ==
Coat of arms of West Northamptonshire Council
Notes Granted in May 2023. Crest On a Wreath Or and Vert in front of a Mount Vert thereon a Tower triple-towered Argent the portcullis raised Or three Garbs banded and two Roses Gules barbed and seeded proper. Escutcheon Vert on a Bend wavy on the upper edge Or four Roses Gules barbed and seeded proper between a Lion's Face and a Garb Or banded Gules. Supporters On the dexter side a Lion guardant Or resting the interior hindpaw on an Escallop Argent and on the sinister side a Bull guardant Sable gorged with a Collar and Line reflexed over the back Or and resting the interior hindleg on a Horseshoe Argent. Motto Ambition, Pride, Unity, Prosperity Badge A Lion sejant guardant supporting a Garb Or thereon four Roses palewise Gules barbed and seeded proper. Symbolism The Dexter supporter, a golden lion, is taken from the arms of Northampton, with the scallop on which it stands, a reference to the arms of the Spencer family, owners of the Althorp Estate. The black bull in sinister, is taken from the former Northamptonshire County Council's arms. The four roses on the escutcheon stand for the towns of Daventry, Brackley, Towcester and Northampton.

== See also ==
- 2019–2023 structural changes to local government in England
- North Northamptonshire Council, another unitary authority created in Northamptonshire in April 2021.
