= Northamptonshire County Council elections =

Local government elections in Northamptonshire, England

Northamptonshire County Council was the county council for Northamptonshire in England. It was initially created in 1889 under the Local Government Act 1888, with its functions being substantially reformed in 1974 under the Local Government Act 1972. The council was abolished in 2021, with the area split into North Northamptonshire and West Northamptonshire. Elections to Northamptonshire County Council were held every four years.

== Council elections ==
- 2001 Northamptonshire County Council election (boundary changes increased the number of seats by 5)
- 2005 Northamptonshire County Council election
- 2009 Northamptonshire County Council election
- 2013 Northamptonshire County Council election
- 2017 Northamptonshire County Council election

== County result maps ==
2001 results map

2005 results map

2009 results map

2013 results map

2017 results map

== By-election results ==
=== 1993–1997 ===
Kingsthorpe By-Election 27 June 1996
Party	Candidate	Votes	%	±%
Liberal Democrats		801	56.6	
Labour		486	34.4	
Conservative		104	7.4	
UKIP		23	1.6	
Majority		315	22.2	
Turnout		1,414	28.2	
Liberal Democrats hold		Swing		

Northampton Park By-Election 31 October 1996
Party	Candidate	Votes	%	±%
Labour		793	51.6	
Conservative		562	36.4	
Liberal Democrats		181	11.8	
Majority		231	15.2	
Turnout		1,536	20.8	
Labour hold		Swing		

=== 2001–2005 ===
Braunston By-Election 1 May 2003
Party	Candidate	Votes	%	±%
Conservative		1,621	68.3	+9.6
Labour		753	31.7	−9.6
Majority		868	36.6	
Turnout		2,374		
Conservative hold		Swing		

Kingswood By-Election 10 July 2003
Party	Candidate	Votes	%	±%
Labour		469	41.9	−30.7
Liberal Democrats		420	37.5	+37.5
Conservative		230	20.6	−6.8
Majority		49	4.4	
Turnout		1,119	17.1	
Labour hold		Swing		

Spencer By-Election 22 January 2004
Party	Candidate	Votes	%	±%
Labour		524	39.2	−20.2
Liberal Democrats		466	34.9	+18.6
Conservative		347	26.0	+1.7
Majority		58	4.3	
Turnout		1,337	21.8	
Labour hold		Swing		

East Hunsbury By-Election 10 June 2004
Party	Candidate	Votes	%	±%
Conservative	Andre Gonzalez de Savage	1,228	48.4	+1.7
Liberal Democrats	Charles Markham	694	27.4	+9.1
Labour	Simon Draper	614	24.2	−10.8
Majority		534	21.0	
Turnout		2,536	38.5	
Conservative hold		Swing		

=== 2005–2009 ===
Long Buckby By-Election 8 March 2007
Party	Candidate	Votes	%	±%
Conservative	Stephen Osborne	1,541	67.0	+2.4
Liberal Democrats	Robert Patchett	456	19.8	+19.8
Labour	Beatrice Price	302	13.1	−22.3
Majority		1,085	47.2	
Turnout		2,299	36.7	
Conservative hold		Swing		

Prebendal By-Election 3 May 2007
Party	Candidate	Votes	%	±%
Conservative	Heather Smith	1,866	70.4	+8.2
Liberal Democrats	David Burgess	461	17.4	−2.8
Labour	David Fisher	322	12.2	−5.4
Majority		1,405	53.0	
Turnout		2,649	44.7	
Conservative hold		Swing		

Uplands By-Election 3 May 2007
Party	Candidate	Votes	%	±%
Conservative	Catherine Boardman	2,307	70.3	+8.6
Liberal Democrats	Robert Patchett	641	19.5	+19.5
Independent	Alan Tebbutt	333	10.1	+10.1
Majority		1,666	50.8	
Turnout		3,281	43.4	
Conservative hold		Swing		

Lloyds By-Election 27 September 2007
Party	Candidate	Votes	%	±%
Labour	Bob Scott	1,093	53.5	−8.7
Conservative	Lynn Wilson	375	18.3	−2.7
Liberal Democrats	Chris Stanbra	311	15.2	−1.6
BNP	Rob Walker	265	13.0	+13.0
Majority		718	35.2	
Turnout		2,044	30.7	
Labour hold		Swing		

=== 2009–2013 ===
Towcester by-election, 9 February 2012
Party	Candidate	Votes	%	±%
Liberal Democrats	Chris Lofts	1,279	60.7%	+32.6%
Conservative	Ian Alexander McCord	638	30.3%	−30.7%
UKIP	Barry Joseph Mahoney	124	5.9%	+5.9%
BNP	Mark Andrew Plowman	66	3.1%	+3.1%
Majority		641	30.4%	
Turnout		2107		
Liberal Democrats gain from Conservative		Swing	+31.7%	

=== 2013–2017 ===
Middleton Cheney by-election, 5 September 2013
Party	Candidate	Votes	%	±%
Conservative	Ronald Sawbridge	1081	52.7	+9.9
UKIP	Barry Joseph Mahoney	604	29.4	−6.0
Labour	Christopher Lee	221	10.8	−2.3
Liberal Democrats	Scott Jon Collins	141	6.9	−1.9
Majority		477	23.6	+16.2
Turnout		2051	22.86	
Conservative hold		Swing		

Braunston and Crick by-election, 3 July 2014
Party	Candidate	Votes	%	±%
Conservative	Malcolm Longley	1,019	40.5	+6.5
Labour	Abigail Campbell	989	39.3	+9.5
UKIP	Eric MacAnndrais	506	20.1	−11.4
Majority		30	1.2	
Turnout		2,514		
Conservative hold		Swing		

Brixworth by-election, 3 July 2014
Party	Candidate	Votes	%	±%
Conservative	Cecile Irving-Swift	1,297	55.4	+4.4
UKIP	Stephen Pointer	500	21.3	−3.7
Labour	Robert McNally	248	10.6	−2.6
Green	Stephen Whiffen	228	9.7	+3.0
Liberal Democrats	Daniel Jones	69	2.9	−1.1
Majority		797	34.0	
Turnout		2,342		
Conservative hold		Swing		

=== 2017–2021 ===
Higham Ferrers by-election, 15 February 2018
Party	Candidate	Votes	%	±%
Conservative	Jason Smithers	1,414	56.6	−3.5
Labour	Gary Day	557	22.3	+3.5
Liberal Democrats	Suzanna Austin	336	13.5	+2.3
UKIP	Bill Cross	109	4.4	−5.5
Green	Simon Turner	81	3.2	+3.2
Majority		857	34.3	
Turnout		2,497		
Conservative hold		Swing		

St George by-election, 19 July 2018
Party	Candidate	Votes	%	±%
Labour	Anjona Roy	839	44.6	+4.3
Liberal Democrats	Martin Sawyer	564	30.0	+0.1
Conservative	Ausra Uzukauskaite	285	15.1	−7.2
UKIP	Andy Smiles	111	5.9	−1.6
Green	Scott Mabbutt	83	4.4	+4.4
Majority		275	14.6	
Turnout		1883	21.4	
Labour hold		Swing		

Oundle by-election, 21 February 2019
Party	Candidate	Votes	%	±%
Conservative	Annabel de Capell Brooke	1,864	51.3	−14.1
Liberal Democrats	Marc Folgate	1,276	35.1	+24.6
Labour	Harry James	403	11.1	−12.9
UKIP	Allan Shipham	89	2.4	+2.4
Majority		588	16.2	
Turnout		3632	36.9	
Conservative hold		Swing		
