= Michael Morris, Baron Naseby =

British Conservative politician (born 1936)

The Right Honourable The Lord Naseby PC
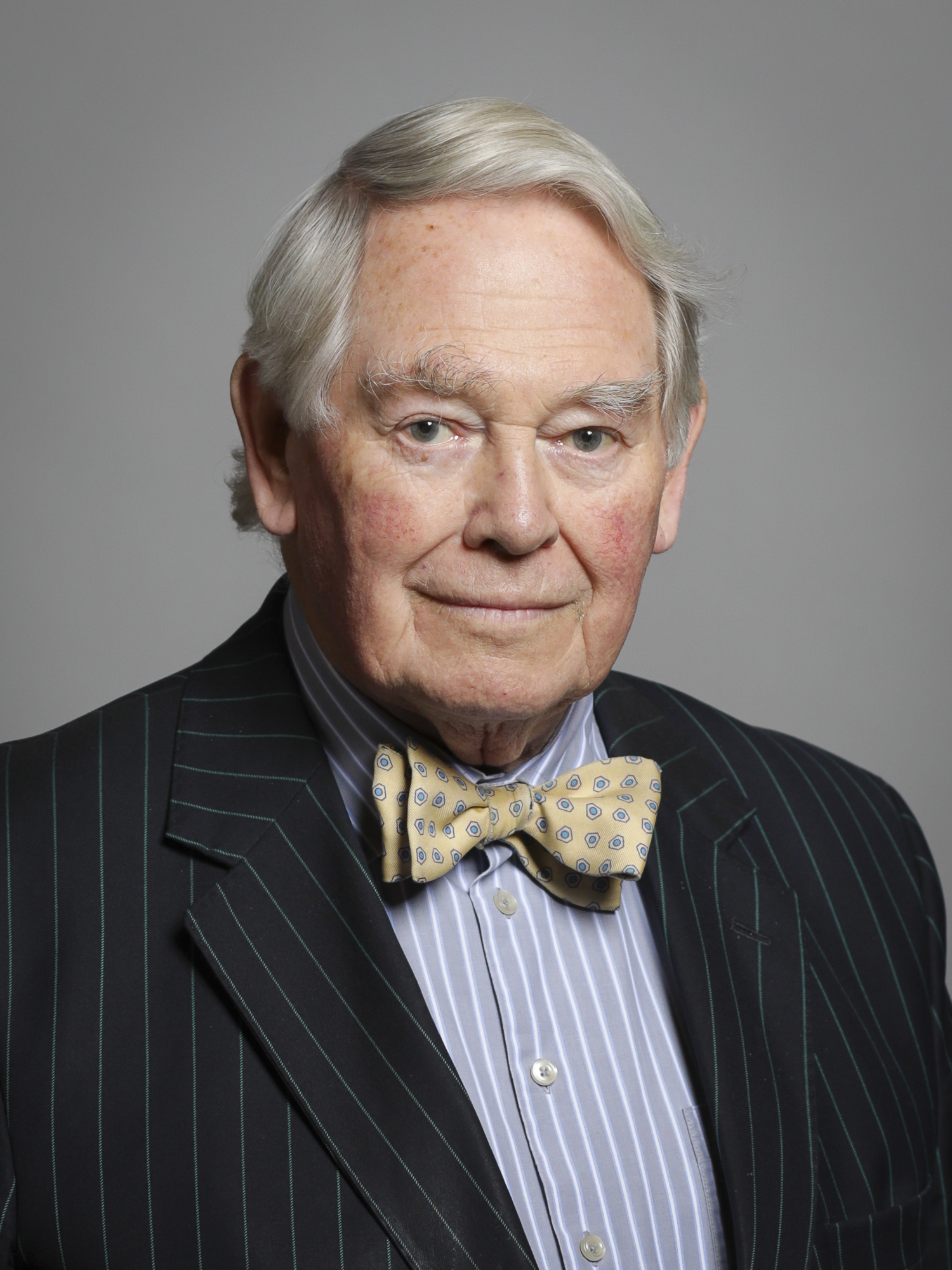
- Official portrait, 2019

Deputy Speaker of the House of Commons Chairman of Ways and Means
- In office 6 May 1992 – 14 May 1997
- Speaker: Betty Boothroyd
- Preceded by: Harold Walker
- Succeeded by: Alan Haselhurst

Member of the House of Lords
- Lord Temporal
- Life peerage 28 October 1997

Member of Parliament for Northampton South
- In office 28 February 1974 – 8 April 1997
- Preceded by: Constituency Created
- Succeeded by: Tony Clarke

Personal details
- Born: 25 November 1936 (age 89) London, United Kingdom
- Party: Conservative
- Spouse: Ann Phyllis Appleby
- Education: St Catharine's College, Cambridge

Michael Wolfgang Laurence Morris, Baron Naseby, PC (born 25 November 1936) is a British Conservative Party politician.

== Early life ==
Born in London and educated at Bedford School and St Catharine's College, Cambridge, Morris was taught to fly in Pakistan and Canada and served in the Royal Air Force.

== Parliamentary career ==
Morris contested Islington North at the 1966 general election, being beaten by Labour's Gerry Reynolds.

He was first elected to the House of Commons at the February 1974 general election for the then-marginal seat of Northampton South. His majority was just 179 in February 1974, and 141 in October 1974. In 1983 boundary changes turned it into a safe Conservative seat.

Morris oversaw the passing of the Maastricht Treaty in the Commons in his role as Deputy Speaker. He was defeated by 744 votes at the 1997 general election, when the Labour Party under Tony Blair won a landslide victory.

From 1992, Morris held the non-voting position of Chairman of Ways and Means and Deputy Speaker, and after the election he accepted a life peerage as Baron Naseby, of Sandy in the County of Bedfordshire on 28 October 1997.

Coat of arms of Michael Morris, Baron Naseby
| Crest Upon a helm with a wreath Argent and Azure behind and grasping two pikes in saltire or beribboned Azure an eagle displayed Argent beaked and legged Or. Escutcheon Azure a pall Argent cotised Or between three lotuses the corollas outwards Argent. Supporters On either side a horse statant erect reguardant Argent maned tailed and unguled and supporting between the forelegs a mace Or. Motto Cogito Ergo Sum |

== Controversies ==
=== Sri Lanka War Crimes ===
In 2014, the Daily Telegraph's chief political commentator Peter Oborne described Lord Naseby as an apologist for the Sri Lankan government, who had given misleading and inaccurate statements about war crimes in Sri Lanka. He was described as giving "comfort to the perpetrators of state sponsored terror" and receiving hospitality from the Sri Lankan government. Human rights groups accuse Lord Naseby of purposely downplaying the death toll figures gathered by the United Nations panel in 2011 which found that as many as 40,000 Tamil civilians may have been killed in the final months of the civil war in 2009.

=== Relationship with the Tobacco Industry ===
Since being elevated in 1997 to the House of Lords, Naseby has opposed UK tobacco regulations often; he has accepted hospitality regularly from the Tobacco Industry, including Japan Tobacco, and from the Tobacco Manufacturers’ Association (TMA), the trade association for UK tobacco firms.

On 21 April 2026, Naseby said in the House of Lords that the Tobacco and Vapes Bill "does upset a great many people in that industry", including tobacco and vape retailers; adding: "What we really need is a proper understanding of how we educate people not to take up smoking."

Parliament of the United Kingdom
| New constituency | Member of Parliament for Northampton South; 1974 – 1997 | Succeeded by Tony Clarke |
| Preceded by Harold Walker | Chairman of Ways and Means; 1992 – 1997 | Succeeded by Sir Alan Haselhurst |
Orders of precedence in the United Kingdom
| Preceded by The Lord Puttnam | Gentlemen; Baron Naseby | Followed by The Lord Stone of Blackheath |
