= Tony Clarke (British politician) =

British politician (born 1963)

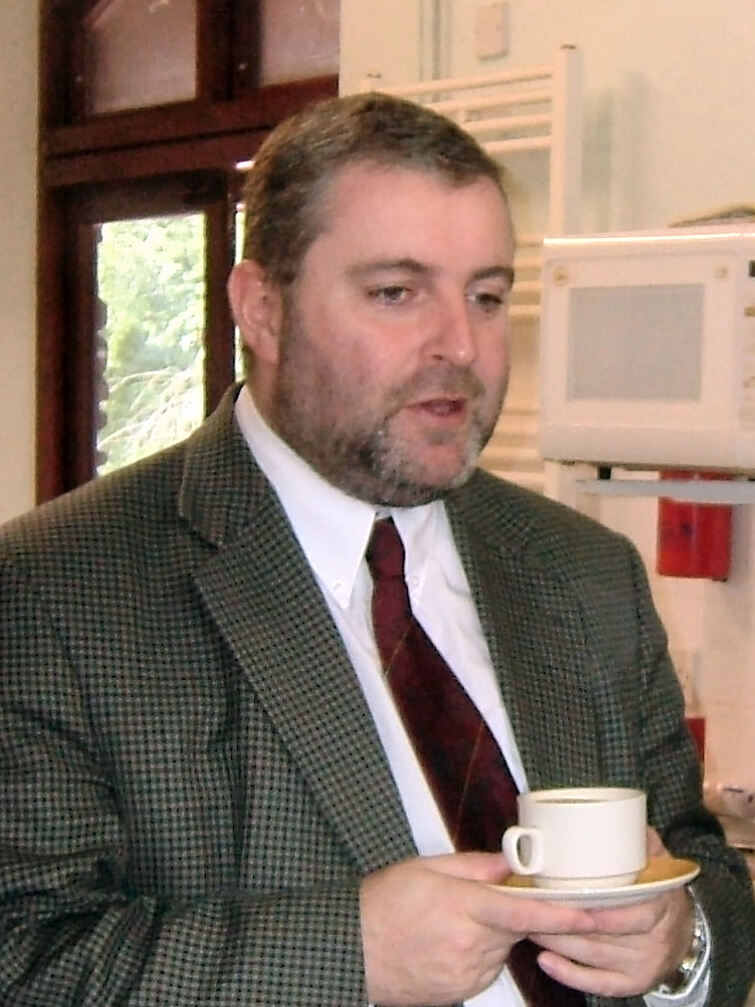
- Clarke in January 2003.

Member of Parliament for Northampton South
- In office 1 May 1997 – 11 April 2005
- Preceded by: Michael Morris
- Succeeded by: Brian Binley

Personal details
- Born: 6 September 1963 (age 63) Northampton
- Party: Green Party
- Other political affiliations: Independent (2007–2013); Labour (until 2007)
- Occupation: Northampton Borough Councillor 2007 – 5 May 2011
- Profession: Teacher

Anthony Richard Clarke (born 6 September 1963, in Northampton, England), commonly known as Tony Clarke, is a British left-of-centre politician, who served as a Labour Party Member of Parliament for Northampton South from the 1997 general election until he was defeated at the 2005 election. Clarke was also a director of Northampton Town F.C. for 11 years from 1999 to 2010, and served as General Manager at the club between 2005 and 2008. He served three terms on Northampton Borough Council, first as a Labour councillor, and then as an independent, and one term on Northamptonshire County Council as an independent. He also served as a Special Constable with Northamptonshire Police between 2003 and 2007.

On 11 March 2013, Clarke announced that he had joined the Green Party, and would campaign as an Independent Green and stand as a Green Party candidate in the 2013 local elections. Clarke has served as the Green Party National Spokesperson on International and Foreign Affairs; he is a local community activist in Northampton and currently teaches public services at Northampton College.

== Labour councillor and MP ==
Before becoming an MP, Clarke had previously been a Social Work lecturer and Labour Councillor on Northampton Borough Council. He won the parliamentary seat unexpectedly at the 1997 general election with a majority of 744 over the sitting Conservative MP Michael Morris, with a campaign based on local representation. Morris, the Deputy Speaker of the House of Commons, had a near 17,000 vote majority at the 1992 general election.

At the 2001 general election, Clarke held the seat with a majority of 885 votes over the Conservative candidate Shailesh Vara. However, Conservative Brian Binley took the seat with a majority of 4,419 at the May 2005 general election.

Clarke was regarded as a rebel and an anti-war MP. Despite his stance against the invasion of Iraq, on receiving a copy of a confidential memo between Prime Minister of the United Kingdom Tony Blair, and US President George W. Bush, he chose to report the leak to the police rather than publicly expose what was said. From 2003 to 2005 he chaired the Northern Ireland Select Committee during the suspension of the NI Assembly.

== Labour expulsion and independent councillor ==
In May 2007, he was chosen by Northampton Labour Party to stand in the safe Labour Castle ward for the 3 May local elections. The decision created a split between the local Labour Party and the Labour party nationally and regionally, and the reasons have never been clear. It is speculated that the regional and national party forced Clarke out and selected their own candidate Tess Scott on an all women short list against the local party's wishes and outside of the Labour Party rules. They then selected Clarke and had three candidates for a two-member ward before telling him he could not stand. As a result, Clarke decided to stand as an Independent and fight against the official Labour Party candidate in Castle ward, a decision which resulted in his expulsion from the Labour Party. Castle was a two-member ward but unusually Labour could only field one candidate.

Eight other local Labour members were also expelled; including Clarke's running mate in the election, Peter Evans, also a previous Borough Councillor; John Dickie, a former Labour leader of the borough council; and a second former Labour leader of the borough council, Geoff Howes. Howes had also been a mayor of the town who, not long before, had been elected by the then controlling Labour party as a Freeman of the Borough.

Clark won the Castle seat on Northampton Borough Council. Out of 47 councillors on the borough council, Labour ended up with only 5 seats, the Conservatives 15, and Clarke as the sole independent. The Liberal Democrats took control with 26 seats, the first time for about 80 years since the Liberals were last in control. Clarke lost his seat at the May 2011 election to Labour, though the Conservatives regained control of the council.

== Re-instatement ==
In December 2008, Howes expulsion was reversed and he was reinstated two days before his appeal was due to be heard by the Labour Party's National Executive Committee (NEC). He was selected as the Labour candidate for a Northampton Borough Council by-election to be held 22 January 2009. However, no official announcement was made by the local party on the status of Clarke or the other two candidates, Evans and Dickie, previously expelled. Dickie was Clarke's election agent at the 2010 general election where Clarke came fourth with 5.8% of the vote, being one of only a small handful of Independents nationally to save their deposit.

== 2009 Northampton Borough Council by-election ==
In January 2009, Howes stood as a Labour candidate in a borough council by-election finishing a distant second to the Conservatives. Howes' selection was without the prior knowledge of the group's leader on the council. A row subsequently erupted when Clarke appeared in Labour by-election literature, endorsing the party's candidate. This resulted in Howes and election agent Anjona Roy also being expelled. Howes died in December 2014 aged 67.

== 2009 and 2013 Northants County Council elections ==
The voters in Castle ward in the centre of Northampton picked Clarke to represent them on the county council at 4 June 2009 County Council elections. Clarke now represented the Castle ward as an independent on both Northampton borough and Northamptonshire county councils. At the count he was observed to have been congratulated by his old Labour colleagues Dickie and Howes (see above). He beat the official Labour candidate into second place in what is normally a solid Labour county council division. In September 2009, the national Labour Party suspended Northampton South Constituency Labour Party. The local paper reported that the move was made after Clarke was featured in local Labour literature given out during the January by-election.

In the 2013 Northamptonshire County Council election, Clarke stood as a candidate for Castle Division coming second with 437 votes to the winning Labour candidate's 806.

== 2010 general election ==
In August 2008, Clarke stated that he would stand against Labour as an independent at the next parliamentary election for Northampton South Constituency and did so on 6 May 2010. He polled fourth with 2,242 votes, behind the three main parties' candidates, and avoiding losing his deposit. His campaign cost over £8,000. He lost his borough seat to Labour in 2011. The boundary of the constituency changed for the 2010 election with the loss of some parts of the southern and western areas to the Daventry and the new South Northamptonshire constituency. The areas lost were generally considered Conservative, thus increasing the possibility of Labour regaining the seat. However, it remained firmly Conservative with Clarke's intervention, having an effect on the Labour vote.

Labour's choice of official candidate was announced in November 2008 as Clyde Loakes, who was born and brought up in Northamptonshire, and who went on to become leader of Waltham Forest council in north-east London. Loakes was absent for much of the campaign. Northampton Borough Council member for West Hunsbury 2007–2011, Paul Varnsverry was selected in October 2008 as the Liberal Democrat's prospective parliamentary candidate for Northampton South which was won by the Conservatives.

== 2015 general election ==
Clarke stood for election again in Northampton, this time changing his constituency to Northampton North and as a Green Party candidate. He achieved 1,503 votes (3.8%) beating the Liberal Democrat candidate Angela Patterson (3.6%). The seat was held by Conservative Michael Ellis, who received 16,699 votes (42.4%). His old Labour colleague Sally Keeble achieved second place with a 34.1% share of the votes.

He wrongly claimed that a company backed by City financier Nathaniel Rothschild had been funding terrorists.

Parliament of the United Kingdom
Preceded by Michael Morris	Member of Parliament for Northampton South; 1997–2005	Succeeded by Brian Binley
