= Northampton South =

UK Parliament constituency (since 1974)

Coordinates: 52.22°N 0.89°W

- Borough constituency for the House of Commons
- Interactive map of boundaries since 2024
- Location within the East Midlands
- County: Northamptonshire
- Electorate: 71,512 (March 2020)
- Major settlements: Northampton (part)

Current constituency
- Created: 1974
- Member of Parliament: Mike Reader (Labour)
- Seats: One
- Created from: Northampton

Northampton South is a constituency (Note: A borough constituency (for the purposes of election expenses and type of returning officer)) represented in the House of Commons of the UK Parliament since 2024 by Mike Reader, representing the Labour Party. (Note: As with all constituencies, the constituency elects one Member of Parliament (MP) by the first past the post system of election at least every five years.)

== Constituency profile ==
Northampton South is a constituency in Northamptonshire in the East Midlands of England. It covers the western, southern and eastern neighbourhoods of the town of Northampton, including Duston, Upton, Far Cotton, Hunsbury (West and East), Wootton, Hardingstone and Billing.

Northampton is one of the UK's largest towns without city status. It is a historic town and was traditionally a major centre for shoemaking. Northampton underwent significant development and expansion during the 1970s after its designation as a new town, the intention of which was to accommodate overspill from Birmingham and London. Many of this constituency's neighbourhoods are historic villages in their own right but were mostly absorbed by the town's 20th-century urban development. The constituency contains the University of Northampton, which has around 14,000 students. Northampton South has above-average levels of wealth. There is some deprivation in Far Cotton close to the town centre and in Billing in the east, however the remainder of the constituency is largely affluent; Hunsbury, Wootton and Weston Favell are all in the top 10% least-deprived areas in England. House prices across the constituency are generally lower than the UK average but higher than the rest of the East Midlands.

Northampton South has an above-average proportion of middle-aged adults and a low retired population. Residents have high rates of income and homeownership and the child poverty rate is below-average. Residents have average levels of education and a high proportion work in the health and transport sectors. The percentage claiming unemployment benefits is lower than the UK-wide rate. White people made up 82% of the population in the 2021 census, around one-seventh of whom were of non-British origin, including Polish and Romanian communities. Asians (primarily Indians) and Black people were 7% each.

At the local council, most of the constituency is represented by Reform UK with some Conservative councillors elected in the wealthier suburbs. An estimated 58% of voters in Northampton South supported leaving the European Union in the 2016 referendum, higher than the UK-wide figure of 52%.

== History ==
This constituency was created for the election of February 1974 when the old constituency of Northampton was split into Northampton South and Northampton North.

Since creation it is generally a marginal and in elections since 1979 but one, in 2005, has been a bellwether, electing an MP from the winning (or largest governing) party.

The one-time Deputy Speaker of the House, Michael Morris, a Conservative, held this seat from its creation in 1974 until 1997, when Tony Clarke defeated Morris in a surprise result (one of many in the Labour landslide of that year) to gain the seat for Labour with a majority of just 744. The Almanac of British Politics described Labour's gain of the seat as "one of the most unexpected results of the 1997 election", despite the fact that Labour had come close to winning the seat in both 1974 elections. Clarke only just increased his majority in 2001, but Brian Binley defeated Clarke to regain the seat for the Conservatives in 2005 with a comfortable majority, and held it until 2015 when he retired and fellow Conservative David Mackintosh held the seat. Mackintosh retired at the 2017 snap election after just one Parliament, after facing the prospect of being deselected by his local constituency party, and Andrew Lewer took over with a decreased majority from 2015 of over 1,000.

== Boundaries ==
=== Historic ===
1974–1983: The County Borough of Northampton wards of Castle, Delapre, Duston, St Crispin, South, and Weston.

1983–1997: The Borough of Northampton wards of Billing, Castle, Delapre, Nene Valley, New Duston, Old Duston, St Crispin, South, and Weston, and the District of South Northamptonshire wards of Blisworth, Brafield, Bugbrooke, Cogenhoe, Gayton, Hackleton, Harpole, Heyford, Kislingbury, Milton, Roade, Salcey, and Yardley.

1997–2010: The Borough of Northampton wards of Billing, Castle, Delapre, Nene Valley, New Duston, Old Duston, St Crispin, South, and Weston, and the District of South Northamptonshire wards of Brafield, Cogenhoe, Hackleton, Harpole, Kislingbury, Milton, Roade, Salcey, and Yardley. From 1999, ward boundary changes created two extra wards from Nene Valley, West Hunsbury and East Hunsbury.

2010–2024: The Borough of Northampton wards of Billing, Castle, Delapre, Ecton Brook, New Duston, Old Duston, St Crispin, St James, Spencer, and Weston.

Following the 2010 redistribution which created South Northamptonshire, the constituency was once again entirely within the Borough of Northampton as opposed to 1983 to 2010 when it also took in outlying rural parts outside the town.

NB: with effect from 1 April 2021, the Borough of Northampton was abolished and absorbed into the new unitary authority of West Northamptonshire.

=== Current ===
Further to the 2023 review of Westminster constituencies, which came into effect for the 2024 general election, the constituency was defined as being composed the following wards of the District of West Northamptonshire (as they existed on 1 April 2021):

- Billing and Rectory Farm; Delapre and Rushmere; Duston East; Duston West and St. Crispin; East Hunsbury and Shelfleys; Nene Valley; Riverside Park; Sixfields.

The constituency has undergone major changes, with those parts of the former Borough of Northampton previously in the South Northamptonshire constituency being added, partly offset by the transfer of the town centre of Northampton to Northampton North.

Further to a local government boundary review which came into effect in May 2025, the constituency now comprises the following wards of West Northamptonshire:

- Billing; Blackthorn and Rectory Farm (most); Castle (small part); Cogenhoe and The Houghtons (small part); Dallington Spencer (part); Duston; Far Cotton, Delapre and Briar Hill; Hunsbury; Nene Valley (most); Upton; Weston Favell and Abington Vale.

== Members of Parliament ==
Northampton prior to 1974

| Election | Member | Party | Notes |
|---|---|---|---|
| Feb 1974 | Michael Morris | Conservative | Chairman of Ways and Means of the House of Commons, 1992–97 |
| 1997 | Tony Clarke | Labour | |
| 2005 | Brian Binley | Conservative | |
| 2015 | David Mackintosh | Conservative | |
| 2017 | Andrew Lewer | Conservative | |
| 2024 | Mike Reader | Labour | |

== Elections ==
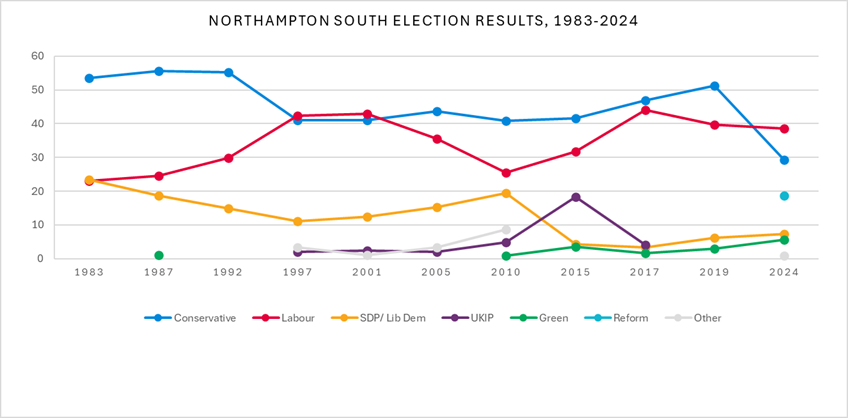
Northampton south election results 1983-2024

=== Elections in the 2020s ===
General election 2024: Northampton South
| Party | Candidate | Votes | % | ±% |
|---|---|---|---|---|
| Labour | Mike Reader | 16,890 | 38.5 | +7.6 |
| Conservative | Andrew Lewer | 12,819 | 29.2 | −28.6 |
| Reform | Anthony Owens | 8,210 | 18.7 | N/A |
| Liberal Democrats | Jill Hope | 3,193 | 7.3 | −0.6 |
| Green | Simon Sneddon | 2,398 | 5.5 | +2.1 |
| TUSC | Katie Simpson | 296 | 0.7 | N/A |
| Climate | Penelope Tollitt | 98 | 0.2 | N/A |
| Majority | | 4,071 | 9.3 | N/A |
| Turnout | | 43,904 | 62.4 | −7.0 |
| Registered electors | | 70,393 | | |
| Labour gain from Conservative | | Swing | +18.1 | |

=== Elections in the 2010s ===
2019 notional result
| Party | Vote | % |
|---|---|---|
| Conservative | 28,652 | 57.8 |
| Labour | 15,328 | 30.9 |
| Liberal Democrats | 3,931 | 7.9 |
| Green | 1,697 | 3.4 |
| Turnout | 49,608 | 69.4 |
| Electorate | 71,512 | |

General election 2019: Northampton South
| Party | Candidate | Votes | % | ±% |
|---|---|---|---|---|
| Conservative | Andrew Lewer | 20,914 | 51.2 | +4.3 |
| Labour | Gareth Eales | 16,217 | 39.7 | −4.3 |
| Liberal Democrats | Jill Hope | 2,482 | 6.1 | +2.7 |
| Green | Scott Mabbutt | 1,222 | 3.0 | +1.3 |
| Majority | | 4,697 | 11.5 | +8.6 |
| Turnout | | 40,835 | 65.7 | −0.8 |
| Conservative hold | | Swing | +4.3 | |

General election 2017: Northampton South
| Party | Candidate | Votes | % | ±% |
|---|---|---|---|---|
| Conservative | Andrew Lewer | 19,231 | 46.9 | +5.3 |
| Labour | Kevin McKeever | 18,072 | 44.0 | +12.2 |
| UKIP | Rose Gibbins | 1,630 | 4.0 | −14.3 |
| Liberal Democrats | Jill Hope | 1,405 | 3.4 | −0.9 |
| Green | Scott Mabbutt | 696 | 1.7 | −1.9 |
| Majority | | 1,159 | 2.9 | −6.9 |
| Turnout | | 41,034 | 66.5 | +3.3 |
| Conservative hold | | Swing | -3.5 | |

General election 2015: Northampton South
| Party | Candidate | Votes | % | ±% |
|---|---|---|---|---|
| Conservative | David Mackintosh | 16,163 | 41.6 | +0.8 |
| Labour | Kevin McKeever | 12,370 | 31.8 | +6.4 |
| UKIP | Rose Gibbins | 7,114 | 18.3 | +13.4 |
| Liberal Democrats | Sadik Chaudhury | 1,673 | 4.3 | −15.1 |
| Green | Julie Hawkins | 1,403 | 3.6 | +2.7 |
| Majority | | 3,793 | 9.8 | −5.6 |
| Turnout | | 38,884 | 63.4 | +5.2 |
| Conservative hold | | Swing | -2.85 | |

General election 2010: Northampton South
| Party | Candidate | Votes | % | ±% |
|---|---|---|---|---|
| Conservative | Brian Binley | 15,917 | 40.8 | +3.0 |
| Labour | Clyde Loakes | 9,913 | 25.4 | −16.1 |
| Liberal Democrats | Paul Varnsverry | 7,579 | 19.4 | +5.9 |
| Independent | Tony Clarke | 2,242 | 5.8 | New |
| UKIP | Derek Clark | 1,897 | 4.9 | +2.8 |
| English Democrat | Kevin Sills | 618 | 1.6 | New |
| Green | Julie Hawkins | 363 | 0.9 | New |
| Northampton Save our Public Services | Dave Green | 325 | 0.8 | New |
| Independent | Kevin Wilshire | 65 | 0.2 | New |
| Scrap Members' Allowances | Liam Costello | 59 | 0.2 | New |
| Majority | | 6,004 | 15.4 | +7.3 |
| Turnout | | 38,978 | 58.2 | −0.6 |
| Conservative hold | | Swing | +6.6 | |

=== Elections in the 2000s ===
General election 2005: Northampton South
| Party | Candidate | Votes | % | ±% |
|---|---|---|---|---|
| Conservative | Brian Binley | 23,818 | 43.7 | +2.6 |
| Labour | Tony Clarke | 19,399 | 35.6 | −7.3 |
| Liberal Democrats | Kevin Barron | 8,327 | 15.3 | +2.8 |
| UKIP | Derek Clark | 1,032 | 1.9 | −0.5 |
| Veritas | Tony Green | 508 | 0.9 | New |
| S O S! Voters Against Overdevelopment of Northampton | John Harrison | 437 | 0.8 | New |
| Monster Raving Loony | John Percival | 354 | 0.6 | New |
| Independent | Fitzy Fitzpatrick | 346 | 0.6 | New |
| CPA | Tim Webb | 260 | 0.5 | New |
| Majority | | 4,419 | 8.1 | N/A |
| Turnout | | 54,481 | 60.7 | +1.1 |
| Conservative gain from Labour | | Swing | +5.0 | |

General election 2001: Northampton South
| Party | Candidate | Votes | % | ±% |
|---|---|---|---|---|
| Labour | Tony Clarke | 21,882 | 42.9 | +0.5 |
| Conservative | Shailesh Vara | 20,997 | 41.1 | 0.0 |
| Liberal Democrats | Andrew Simpson | 6,355 | 12.5 | +1.4 |
| UKIP | Derek Clark | 1,237 | 2.4 | +0.4 |
| Liberated Party | Tina Harvey | 362 | 0.7 | New |
| ProLife Alliance | Clare Johnson | 196 | 0.4 | New |
| Majority | | 885 | 1.8 | +0.5 |
| Turnout | | 51,029 | 59.6 | −12.1 |
| Labour hold | | Swing | | |

=== Elections in the 1990s ===
General election 1997: Northampton South
| Party | Candidate | Votes | % | ±% |
|---|---|---|---|---|
| Labour | Tony Clarke | 24,214 | 42.4 | +14.1 |
| Conservative | Michael Morris | 23,470 | 41.1 | −14.6 |
| Liberal Democrats | Anthony Worgan | 6,316 | 11.1 | −3.1 |
| Referendum | Christopher Petrie | 1,405 | 2.5 | New |
| UKIP | Derek Clark | 1,159 | 2.0 | New |
| Natural Law | Graham Woollcombe | 541 | 0.9 | New |
| Majority | | 744 | 1.3 | N/A |
| Turnout | | 57,105 | 71.7 | −8.2 |
| Labour gain from Conservative | | Swing | +14.1 | |

General election 1992: Northampton South
| Party | Candidate | Votes | % | ±% |
|---|---|---|---|---|
| Conservative | Michael Morris | 36,882 | 55.3 | −0.4 |
| Labour | John Dickie | 19,909 | 29.8 | +5.2 |
| Liberal Democrats | Graham Mabbutt | 9,912 | 14.9 | −3.7 |
| Majority | | 16,973 | 25.5 | −5.6 |
| Turnout | | 66,703 | 79.9 | +4.7 |
| Conservative hold | | Swing | −2.8 | |

=== Elections in the 1980s ===
General election 1987: Northampton South
| Party | Candidate | Votes | % | ±% |
|---|---|---|---|---|
| Conservative | Michael Morris | 31,864 | 55.7 | +2.1 |
| Labour | John Dickie | 14,061 | 24.6 | −1.2 |
| SDP | George Hopkins | 10,639 | 18.6 | −4.8 |
| Green | Margaret Hamilton | 647 | 1.1 | New |
| Majority | | 17,803 | 31.1 | +0.9 |
| Turnout | | 57,211 | 75.2 | +2.6 |
| Conservative hold | | Swing | +1.7 | |

General election 1983: Northampton South
| Party | Candidate | Votes | % | ±% |
|---|---|---|---|---|
| Conservative | Michael Morris | 26,824 | 53.6 | |
| SDP | Keith Kyle | 11,698 | 23.4 | |
| Labour | Martin Coleman | 11,533 | 23.0 | |
| Majority | | 15,126 | 30.2 | |
| Turnout | | 50,055 | 72.6 | |
| Conservative hold | | Swing | | |

=== Elections in the 1970s ===
General election 1979: Northampton South
| Party | Candidate | Votes | % | ±% |
|---|---|---|---|---|
| Conservative | Michael Morris | 19,125 | 49.67 | |
| Labour | Graham Mason | 15,491 | 40.24 | |
| Liberal | D Amey | 3,478 | 9.03 | |
| National Front | M James | 407 | 1.06 | New |
| Majority | | 3,634 | 9.43 | |
| Turnout | | 38,501 | 75.27 | |
| Conservative hold | | Swing | | |

General election October 1974: Northampton South
| Party | Candidate | Votes | % | ±% |
|---|---|---|---|---|
| Conservative | Michael Morris | 14,393 | 42.98 | |
| Labour | J Dilks | 14,252 | 42.56 | |
| Liberal | RF Miller | 4,842 | 14.46 | |
| Majority | | 141 | 0.42 | |
| Turnout | | 33,487 | 75.52 | |
| Conservative hold | | Swing | | |

General election February 1974: Northampton South
| Party | Candidate | Votes | % | ±% |
|---|---|---|---|---|
| Conservative | Michael Morris | 14,321 | 40.27 | |
| Labour | J Dilks | 14,142 | 39.77 | |
| Liberal | RF Miller | 7,099 | 19.96 | |
| Majority | | 179 | 0.50 | |
| Turnout | | 35,562 | 80.82 | |
| Conservative win (new seat) | | | | |

== See also ==
- List of parliamentary constituencies in Northamptonshire
