= 2005 Northamptonshire County Council election =

2005 UK local government election

← 2001	5 May 2005	2009 →

All 73 seats in the Northamptonshire County Council 37 seats needed for a majority
	First party	Second party	Third party
Party	Conservative	Labour	Liberal Democrats
Seats won	45	21	7
Seat change	▲11	▼17	▲5
Popular vote	142,297	115,853	44,775
Percentage	45.8%	37.3%	14.4%
- Map showing the results of the 2005 Northamptonshire County Council elections.
Council control before election
Labour
Council control after election
Conservative

The 2005 Northamptonshire County Council election took place on 5 May 2005 to elect members of Northamptonshire County Council, England. The whole council was up for election and the Conservative Party gained overall control of the council from the Labour Party.

== Background ==
The 2005 election to Northamptonshire County Council coincided with the 2005 general election, this meant that turnout was significantly higher than is usual for local government elections. However, between 1997 and 2005 County Council Elections coincided with General Elections, meaning that turnout was significantly higher than would otherwise be expected. Every seat was single member, elected using the First Past the Post system used for most local elections in England and Wales.

== Election results ==
Mirroring national trends the election saw a swing away from the social democratic Labour Party towards the centre-right Conservative Party, with the Liberal Democrats picking up a few more seats. The Conservatives captured the council ending 12 years of Labour control and producing the first Conservative majority administration in 28 years, and only the second since the councils formation in 1973. Turnout was 63.8% up 1.2% on 2001 and 28 new Councillors joined the council. Note that there was a General Election at the same time as the county election in 2005 - this generally increases the numbers of people who turn out to vote in both elections which take place at the same time and place. (See for comparison the Northamptonshire County Council Election in 2009 when there was no General Election.)

Northamptonshire County Council election, 2005
Party	Seats	Gains	Losses	Net gain/loss	Seats %	Votes %	Votes	+/−
Conservative	45			+13	61.6			
Labour	21			-17	28.8			
Liberal Democrats	7			+5	9.6			
Independent	0			-1	0.0			

== Division by Division Results by County Borough ==
- In order of number of votes with the winning candidate first

=== Corby Borough ===

Corby Central Division
Party	Candidate	Votes	%	±%
Labour	Mark Bullock	2,275		
Conservative	Robert Tustin	640		
Liberal Democrats	Francis O'Brien	544		
Majority				
Turnout		3,459		
Labour hold		Swing		

Corby Rural Division
Party	Candidate	Votes	%	±%
Conservative	Stanley Heggs	2,002		
Labour	James Wade	1,939		
Liberal Democrats	Terene Meechan	825		
Majority				
Turnout		4,766		
Conservative gain from Labour				

Danesholme Division
Party	Candidate	Votes	%	±%
Labour	James McKellar	2,035		
Liberal Democrats	Christopher Stanbra	1,214		
Conservative	Bernard Howard	1,123		
Majority				
Turnout		4,372		
Labour hold		Swing		

Kingswood Division
Party	Candidate	Votes	%	±%
Labour	John McGhee	2,086		
Conservative	Yvonne von Bujtar	804		
Liberal Democrats	Richard Jones	622		
Majority				
Turnout		3,512		
Labour hold		Swing		

Lloyds Division
Party	Candidate	Votes	%	±%
Labour	James Kane	2,620		
Conservative	Sally Hogston	886		
Liberal Democrats	Sidney Beecroft	707		
Majority				
Turnout		4,213		
Labour hold		Swing		

Shire Lodge Division
Party	Candidate	Votes	%	±%
Labour	Julie Brookfield	2,379		
Conservative	Brian Cummings	1,015		
Liberal Democrats	Julie Connachie	797		
Majority				
Turnout		4,191		
Labour hold		Swing		

=== Daventry District ===
Braunston Division
Party	Candidate	Votes	%	±%
Conservative	Robin Brown	3,126		
Labour	Penelope Price	1,869		
Majority				
Turnout		4,995		
Conservative hold		Swing		

Brixworth Division
Party	Candidate	Votes	%	±%
Conservative	John Millar	3,581		
Labour	Christopher Grethe	1,550		
Majority				
Turnout		5,131		
Conservative hold		Swing		

Daventry West Division
Party	Candidate	Votes	%	±%
Labour	Olwen Loud	2,293		
Conservative	Annette Dunn	1,982		
Majority				
Turnout		4,275		
Labour hold		Swing		

Daventry East Division
Party	Candidate	Votes	%	±%
Conservative	Alan Hills	2,243		
Labour	Janet Penrose	1,909		
Majority				
Turnout		4,152		
Conservative hold		Swing		

Long Buckby Division
Party	Candidate	Votes	%	±%
Conservative	Richard Amos	2,829		
Labour	Christopher Myers	1,550		
Majority				
Turnout		4,379		
Conservative hold		Swing		

Moulton Division
Party	Candidate	Votes	%	±%
Conservative	Judith Shephard	2,872		
Labour	Mark Maryan	1,358		
Majority				
Turnout		4,230		
Conservative hold		Swing		

Uplands Division
Party	Candidate	Votes	%	±%
Conservative	Katharine Hemmings	3,425		
Labour	David Nicholl	1,259		
Green	Katharine Wickstead	869		
Majority				
Turnout		5,553		
Conservative hold		Swing		

Weedon Bec & Woodford Division
Party	Candidate	Votes	%	±%
Conservative	Gina Ogden	2,506		
Liberal Democrats	Malcolm Adcock	1,904		
Majority				
Turnout		4,410		
Conservative hold		Swing		

=== East Northants District ===
Higham Ferrers Division
Party	Candidate	Votes	%	±%
Conservative	Derek Lawson	2,548		
Labour	Geoffrey Moore	1,582		
Independent	Richard Gell	930		
Majority				
Turnout		5,060		
Conservative hold		Swing		

Irthlingborough Division
Party	Candidate	Votes	%	±%
Conservative	Andrew Langley	2,387		
Labour	John Farrar	2,098		
Majority				
Turnout		4,485		
Conservative gain from Labour				

Oundle Division
Party	Candidate	Votes	%	±%
Conservative	Charles Reichhold	2,774		
Labour	Alan Brookfield	1,045		
Liberal Democrats	David Nesbitt	993		
Independent	John Smoker	172		
Majority				
Turnout		4,984		
Conservative hold		Swing		

Prebendal Division
Party	Candidate	Votes	%	±%
Conservative	Priscilla Padley	2,734		
Liberal Democrats	David Burgess	885		
Labour	Maureen Forshaw	773		
Majority				
Turnout		4,392		
Conservative hold		Swing		

Raunds Division
Party	Candidate	Votes	%	±%
Conservative	Albert Campbell	2,262		
Labour	Lorraine Taylor	1,630		
Majority				
Turnout		3,892		
Conservative gain from Labour				

Rushden East Division
Party	Candidate	Votes	%	±%
Conservative	Andrew Mercer	1,855		
Labour	Leonard Cox	1,643		
Liberal Democrats	David Hooton	749		
Majority				
Turnout		4,247		
Conservative gain from Labour				

Rushden South Division
Party	Candidate	Votes	%	±%
Conservative	Michael Tye	2,887		
Labour	Leslie Rolfe	2,039		
Majority				
Turnout		4,926		
Conservative hold		Swing		

Rushden West Division
Party	Candidate	Votes	%	±%
Conservative	Ronald Pinnock	2,067		
Labour	Frederick Jones	1,696		
Majority				
Turnout		3,763		
Conservative gain from Labour				

Thrapston Division
Party	Candidate	Votes	%	±%
Conservative	Robert Seery	2,766		
Labour	Madeline Whiteman	1,379		
UKIP	Peter Baden	476		
Majority				
Turnout		4,221		
Conservative hold		Swing		

=== Kettering Borough ===
Brambleside Division
Party	Candidate	Votes	%	±%
Conservative	William Parker	1,756		
Labour	Adrian Chambers	1,648		
Liberal Democrats	Alan Window	498		
Independent	Dereck Hilling	230		
Majority				
Turnout		4,132		
Conservative gain from Labour				

Burton Division
Party	Candidate	Votes	%	±%
Conservative	Christopher Lamb	1,515		
Labour	Ronald Steele	1,365		
Independent	Christopher Groome	1,049		
Liberal Democrats	Stuart Simons	466		
Majority				
Turnout		4,395		
Conservative hold		Swing		

Desborough Division
Party	Candidate	Votes	%	±%
Conservative	Belinda Humfrey	2,169		
Labour	David Coe	1,932		
Liberal Democrats	Philip Rice	537		
Majority				
Turnout		4,638		
Conservative gain from Labour				

Grange Division
Party	Candidate	Votes	%	±%
Labour	Royston Mayhew	2,165		
Conservative	Michael Tebbutt	932		
Majority				
Turnout		3,097		
Labour hold		Swing		

Ise Division
Party	Candidate	Votes	%	±%
Conservative	Robert Civil	2,145		
Labour	Paul Corazzo	1,550		
Liberal Democrats	Christopher McGlynn	654		
Majority				
Turnout		4,349		
Conservative hold		Swing		

Kettering Central Division
Party	Candidate	Votes	%	±%
Labour	Eileen Hales	2,314		
Conservative	John Henson	1,707		
Majority				
Turnout		4,021		
Labour hold		Swing		

Kettering Rural Division
Party	Candidate	Votes	%	±%
Conservative	James Harker	3,908		
Labour	Emma Poole	1,965		
Majority				
Turnout		5,873		
Conservative hold		Swing		

Rothwell Division
Party	Candidate	Votes	%	±%
Conservative	Alan Pate	1,944		
Labour	David Whyte	1,825		
Majority				
Turnout		3,769		
Conservative gain from Labour				

St Andrews and St Peters Division
Party	Candidate	Votes	%	±%
Labour	Jonathan West	2,404		
Conservative	Matthew Lynch	2,114		
Majority				
Turnout		4,518		
Labour hold		Swing		

Wicksteed Division
Party	Candidate	Votes	%	±%
Conservative	Ursula Jones	1,882		
Labour	Alexander Gordon	1,742		
Liberal Democrats	John Coleman	1,026		
Majority				
Turnout		4,650		
Conservative hold		Swing		

=== Northampton Borough ===
Abington Division
Party	Candidate	Votes	%	±%
Liberal Democrats	Brian Hoare	1,304		
Labour	Michael Boss	1,268		
Conservative	Leon Bailey	825		
Green	Marcus Rock	264		
Majority				
Turnout		3,661		
Liberal Democrats gain from Labour				

Billing Division
Party	Candidate	Votes	%	±%
Conservative	Christopher Malpas	1,525		
Labour	Debra Boss	1,306		
Liberal Democrats	Kevin Alderton	740		
Majority				
Turnout		3,571		
Conservative gain from Labour				

Boughton Green Division
Party	Candidate	Votes	%	±%
Liberal Democrats	John Yates	1,712		
Conservative	Michael Hallam	1,297		
Labour	Tess Scott	1,277		
Majority				
Turnout		4,286		
Liberal Democrats gain from Labour				

Castle Division
Party	Candidate	Votes	%	±%
Labour	Rosemarie Dickie	1,503		
Conservative	Edward Barham	766		
Liberal Democrats	Grant Bowles	752		
Independent	Peter Harrisson	157		
Majority				
Turnout		3,178		
Labour hold		Swing		

Delapre Division
Party	Candidate	Votes	%	±%
Liberal Democrats	Brendan Glynane	1,342		
Labour	Chaman Kalyan	1,288		
Conservative	Michelle Hoare	1,006		
Majority				
Turnout		3,636		
Liberal Democrats gain from Labour				

Eastfield Division
Party	Candidate	Votes	%	±%
Labour	Barry Kirkby	1,490		
Conservative	David Acock	1,180		
Liberal Democrats	Jean Hawkins	1,008		
Green	Anthony Lochmuller	158		
CPA	Colin Bricher	105		
Majority				
Turnout		3,941		
Labour hold		Swing		

East Hunsbury Division
Party	Candidate	Votes	%	±%
Conservative	Andre Savage	1,925		
Labour	Simon Draper	1,236		
Liberal Democrats	Charles Markham	679		
Green	Lisa Warner	199		
Majority				
Turnout		4,039		
Conservative hold		Swing		

Ecton Brook Division
Party	Candidate	Votes	%	±%
Conservative	Jamie Lane	1,134		
Labour	Arthur McCutcheon	1,086		
Liberal Democrats	Ruth Williams	641		
CPA	Timothy Webb	95		
Majority				
Turnout		2,956		
Conservative gain from Labour				

Headlands Division
Party	Candidate	Votes	%	±%
Liberal Democrats	David Garlick	1,668		
Conservative	Paul Rolfe	1,476		
Labour	Trevor Bailey	1,190		
Green	Muriel Upton	110		
Majority				
Turnout		4,444		
Liberal Democrats gain from Labour				

Kingsley Division
Party	Candidate	Votes	%	±%
Liberal Democrats	Richard Church	1,677		
Labour	Nova Keown	1,349		
Conservative	Marie Carter	830		
Green	Derek Pickup	188		
Independent	Monica Withrington	81		
Majority				
Turnout		4,125		
Liberal Democrats gain from Labour				

Kingsthorpe Division
Party	Candidate	Votes	%	±%
Liberal Democrats	Sally Beardsworth	2,069		
Labour	Trevor Owen	978		
Conservative	David Mackintosh	859		
BNP	Fiona Woodward	153		
Independent	Paul Withrington	103		
Green	Anthony Upton	78		
Majority				
Turnout		4,240		
Liberal Democrats hold		Swing		

Lumbertubs Division
Party	Candidate	Votes	%	±%
Labour	Ulrick Gravesande	1,399		
Conservative	Stuart Penketh	768		
Liberal Democrats	Eva Down	620		
CPA	Andrew Otchie	74		
Majority				
Turnout		2,861		
Labour hold		Swing		

Nene Valley Division
Party	Candidate	Votes	%	±%
Conservative	Michael Hill	2,674		
Labour	Stephen Croke	1,344		
Liberal Democrats	Maria Crake	872		
Green	Evelyn Lander	278		
Majority				
Turnout		5,168		
Conservative hold		Swing		

New Duston Division
Party	Candidate	Votes	%	±%
Conservative	Elizabeth Tavener	2,160		
Labour	Dvija Mehta	1,114		
Liberal Democrats	Irene Markham	659		
Independent	Susan Edkins	325		
Majority				
Turnout		4,258		
Conservative hold		Swing		

Old Duston Division
Party	Candidate	Votes	%	±%
Conservative	Don Edwards	1,743		
Labour	Francis Lilley	1,542		
Liberal Democrats	Katherine Abu	544		
Independent	Karen Dare	239		
Majority				
Turnout		4,068		
Conservative hold		Swing		

Parklands Division
Party	Candidate	Votes	%	±%
Conservative	Brandon Eldred	1,873		
Labour	Iftikhar Choudary	1,288		
Liberal Democrats	Malcolm Mildren	1,132		
Majority				
Turnout		4,293		
Conservative hold		Swing		

Spencer Division
Party	Candidate	Votes	%	±%
Labour	Melanie de Cruz	1,277		
Conservative	Laura Norman	681		
Liberal Democrats	Anthony Woods	592		
Independent	Roger Conroy	361		
Majority				
Turnout		2,911		
Labour hold		Swing		

St Crispin Division
Party	Candidate	Votes	%	±%
Labour	Winston Strachan	1,374		
Conservative	Penelope Flavell	936		
Liberal Democrats	Phillip Buchan	629		
Green	Rebecca Smith	243		
Independent	Tina Harvey	44		
Majority				
Turnout		3,226		
Labour hold		Swing		

St David Division
Party	Candidate	Votes	%	±%
Liberal Democrats	Jane Hollis	1,318		
Labour	Vivian Dams	1,214		
Conservative	Richard Booker	665		
Majority				
Turnout		3,197		
Liberal Democrats gain from Labour				

St James Division
Party	Candidate	Votes	%	±%
Labour	Terence Wire	1,558		
Conservative	Ian McCann	1,317		
Liberal Democrats	Scott Collins	746		
Majority				
Turnout		3,621		
Labour hold		Swing		

Thorplands Division
Party	Candidate	Votes	%	±%
Labour	Leslie Patterson	1,358		
Conservative	Brian Jarvis	788		
Liberal Democrats	Dennis Meredith	735		
Majority				
Turnout		2,881		
Labour hold		Swing		

West Hunsbury Division
Party	Candidate	Votes	%	±%
Conservative	Charles Hugheston-Roberts	1,618		
Liberal Democrats	John Rawlings	1,334		
Labour	Alan Kingston	796		
Majority				
Turnout		3,748		
Conservative hold		Swing		

Weston Division
Party	Candidate	Votes	%	±%
Conservative	Maureen Hill	2,527		
Labour	Anjona Roy	1,235		
Liberal Democrats	Michael Beardsworth	995		
Majority				
Turnout		4,757		
Conservative hold		Swing		

=== South Northamptonshire District ===
Brackley East Division
Party	Candidate	Votes	%	±%
Conservative	Andrew Grant	2,728		
Labour	Douglas Berry	1,858		
Majority				
Turnout		4,586		
Conservative hold		Swing		

Brackley West Division
Party	Candidate	Votes	%	±%
Conservative	Ronald Sawbridge	2,156		
Liberal Democrats	Janet Arkwright	986		
Labour	Valerie Whitaker	952		
Green	Katherine Pate	318		
Majority				
Turnout		4,412		
Conservative hold		Swing		

Bugbrooke Division
Party	Candidate	Votes	%	±%
Conservative	Joan Kirkbride	2,814		
Labour	John King	982		
Liberal Democrats	Martin Taylor	784		
Majority				
Turnout		4,580		
Conservative hold		Swing		

Deanshanger Division
Party	Candidate	Votes	%	±%
Conservative	Alan Walker	2,344		
Labour	David Aaronson	1,508		
Liberal Democrats	Rodney Kilvert	1,083		
Majority				
Turnout		4,935		
Conservative hold		Swing		

Greens Norton Division
Party	Candidate	Votes	%	±%
Conservative	Benjamin Smith	3,482		
Labour	Charles Parkin	1,440		
Majority				
Turnout		4,922		
Conservative hold		Swing		

Hackleton Division
Party	Candidate	Votes	%	±%
Conservative	Brian Binley	2,895		
Labour	Stephen Winder	1,021		
Liberal Democrats	Marianne Taylor	777		
Majority				
Turnout		4,693		
Conservative hold		Swing		

Middleton Cheney Division
Party	Candidate	Votes	%	±%
Conservative	Kenneth Malling	3,024		
Labour	Gart Youens	1,972		
Majority				
Turnout		4,996		
Conservative hold		Swing		

Roade Division
Party	Candidate	Votes	%	±%
Conservative	Bernard Ingram	2,944		
Labour	Ronald Johnson	1,491		
Liberal Democrats	Richard Matthews	945		
Majority				
Turnout		5,380		
Conservative hold		Swing		

Towcester Division
Party	Candidate	Votes	%	±%
Conservative	Rosemary Bromwich	2,004		
Liberal Democrats	Oliver Low	1,195		
Labour	Drisc Wardle	1,115		
Majority				
Turnout		4,314		
Conservative hold		Swing		

=== Wellingborough Borough ===
Croyland Division
Party	Candidate	Votes	%	±%
Labour	Maureen Shram	2,097		
Conservative	Bhupendra Patel	1,518		
Liberal Democrats	Peter Atkins	993		
Majority				
Turnout		4,608		
Labour hold		Swing		

Earls Barton Division
Party	Candidate	Votes	%	±%
Labour	George Blackwell	2,720		
Conservative	David Smith	2,423		
Majority				
Turnout		5,143		
Labour hold		Swing		

Finedon Division
Party	Candidate	Votes	%	±%
Conservative	John Bailey	3,180		
Labour	John Robinson	1,783		
Majority				
Turnout		4,963		
Conservative hold		Swing		

Hemmingwell Division
Party	Candidate	Votes	%	±%
Labour	James Ashton	2,306		
Conservative	Graham Lawman	1.988		
Majority				
Turnout		4,294		
Labour gain from Conservative		Swing		

Irchester Division
Party	Candidate	Votes	%	±%
Conservative	Alan Bailey	1,965		
Labour	Timothy Maguire	1,925		
Liberal Democrats	Keith Clements	643		
Majority				
Turnout		4,533		
Conservative gain from Labour				

Queensway Division
Party	Candidate	Votes	%	±%
Labour	Patricia Jones	2,003		
Conservative	Kenneth Harrington	1,196		
Green	Jonathan Hornett	377		
Majority				
Turnout		3,576		
Labour hold		Swing		

Redwell Division
Party	Candidate	Votes	%	±%
Conservative	Malcolm Waters	2,132		
Labour	Neville Marsden	1,508		
Liberal Democrats	Penelope Wilkins	619		
Majority				
Turnout		4,259		
Conservative hold		Swing		

Swanspool Division
Party	Candidate	Votes	%	±%
Labour	Patricia Cass	1,785		
Conservative	Paul Bell	1,545		
Liberal Democrats	Margaret Atkins	561		
Green	Ann Parsons	172		
Majority				
Turnout		4,063		
Labour hold		Swing		
