= Brian Binley =

British politician (1942–2020)

Member of Parliament for Northampton South
- In office 5 May 2005 – 30 March 2015
- Preceded by: Tony Clarke
- Succeeded by: David Mackintosh

Personal details
- Born: 1 April 1942 Finedon, Northamptonshire, England
- Died: 25 December 2020 (aged 78) Northampton, Northamptonshire, England
- Party: Conservative
- Occupation: Businessman

Brian Arthur Roland Binley (1 April 1942 – 25 December 2020) was a British Conservative Party politician. He was the Member of Parliament (MP) for Northampton South from 2005 to 2015.

== Early life ==
Educated at Finedon Mulso Secondary Modern School on Wellingborough Road, (now a Junior School), in the town of Finedon in Northamptonshire, Brian Binley joined the Conservative Party in 1958. He was an organiser with the National Young Conservatives from 1965 to 1968. He was chairman of the Wellingborough-based BCC Marketing Services Ltd, the company he founded from 1988 to 2001, when it was liquidated by the company that had bought it in late 2001.

== Parliamentary career ==
Binley was the Parliamentary Agent for the Wyre Forest Conservative Association during the 1997 general election campaign. He was elected to Northamptonshire County Council in 1997, where he was a Cabinet Member. He was selected to contest the Labour-held Parliamentary marginal seat of Northampton South, and defeated the sitting Labour MP Tony Clarke at the 2005 general election by over 4,000 votes. Binley made his maiden speech on 25 May 2005.

He was also a Northamptonshire County Councillor for Hackleton division but did not restand for the county council at elections held in 2009.

Binley was re-elected in the 2010 general election, with an increased majority of 6,004.

In March 2012, Binley was reported as being one of the Conservative MPs to have spoken critically of Party Co-Chairman Sayeeda Warsi at a meeting of the 1922 Committee, following Lady Warsi's handling of Roger Helmer MEP's defection to UKIP and later called on her to resign saying she was guilty of "self-destructive lunacy". He was also a critic of David Cameron calling on him to "smell the coffee" after the Conservatives faced a terrible defeat in the 2012 local elections and even criticised Number 10 more widely and their attitude towards Conservative backbenchers. He also criticised David Cameron's decision to hire Andy Coulson.

== Expenses ==
On 17 June 2009 it was revealed that Binley had claimed over £50,000 in expenses, renting a flat from his own company, BCC Marketing. Two months after beginning to rent the flat, expenses rules were changed to clarify that MPs could no longer rent properties from businesses in which they had an interest. Binley appealed to the Speaker of the House Michael Martin, whilst still claiming for the flat. Binley lost his appeal after two and a half years, during which time he still claimed for the flat in question. Binley was not required to repay the £57,000 he received while the Speaker deliberated.

== Personal life ==
Binley lived in the constituency for over 20 years, and had two grown sons. In 2006, he became the victim of identity theft, when someone tried to divert his bank statements and unsuccessfully attempted to steal £9,000 from him whilst he was in India. The perpetrator wrote to Binley boasting of his exploits.

He received a six-month driving ban in May 2007 having totted up 12 points on his licence when caught doing 37 mph in a 30 mph zone in Wellingborough, Northamptonshire. With nine points already, he was given three more and a ban by Towcester magistrates.

In January 2013, Binley revealed he was suffering from "low-grade lymphoma affecting white blood cells" and would undergo chemotherapy. In July 2013 Binley stated he would not stand again at the next general election in 2015.

Binley died at Northampton General Hospital on 25 December 2020, aged 78.

Parliament of the United Kingdom
Preceded by Tony Clarke	Member of Parliament for Northampton South; 2005–2015	Succeeded by David Mackintosh
