= 2017 Northamptonshire County Council election =

2017 UK local government election

← 2013	4 May 2017	West 2021 → North 2021 →

All 57 seats to Northamptonshire County Council 29 seats needed for a majority
- Turnout: 33.4% (▲2.5 pp)
	First party	Second party	Third party
Party	Conservative	Labour	Liberal Democrats
Seats before	36	11	6
Seats won	43	12	2
Seat change	▲7	▲1	▼4
Popular vote	90,813	49,512	21,777
Percentage	51.1%	27.8%	12.2%
- Map showing the results of the 2017 Northamptonshire County Council elections.
Council control before election
Conservative
Council control after election
Conservative

The 2017 Northamptonshire County Council election took place on 4 May 2017 as part of the 2017 local elections in the United Kingdom. County councillors were elected from all 57 electoral divisions which returned one county councillor to Northamptonshire County Council by first-past-the-post voting for a four-year term of office. These elections were the last held for Northamptonshire County Council before its dissolution in 2021.

== Results summary ==
Northamptonshire County Council election, 2017
Party	Candidates						Votes		
Party	Stood	Elected	Gained	Unseated	Net	% of total	%	No.	Net %
Conservative	57	43	7	0	+7	75.44	51.3	90,727	+14.5
Labour	57	12	3	2	+1	21.05	27.8	49,131	+1.6
Liberal Democrats	57	2	1	5	-4	3.51	12.2	21,667	+3.5
UKIP	36	0	0	3	-3	0.00	5.5	9,789	-17.2
Green	21	0			0	0.00	2.0	3,457	+0.5
Independent	5	0			0	0.00	1.2	2,163	-2.9

== Results by Division ==
=== Corby ===
Corby Rural
Party	Candidate	Votes	%
Conservative	Sandra Naden-Horley	1,611	52.12
Labour	Bob Riley	1,171	37.88
Liberal Democrats	Terri Meechan	309	10.0
Turnout		3091	38.32
Conservative hold			

Corby West
Party	Candidate	Votes	%
Labour	Julie Brookfield	1,854	56.96
Conservative	Harriet Pentland	1,102	33.86
Green	Steven Scrutton	210	6.45
Liberal Democrats	Sidney Beecroft	89	2.73
Turnout		3255	33.3
Labour hold			

Kingswood
Party	Candidate	Votes	%
Labour	John McGhee	1,755	67.47
Conservative	Ollie Lewis	609	23.41
Green	Michael Mahon	177	6.81
Liberal Democrats	Garth Ratcliffe	60	2.31
Turnout		2601	25.1
Labour hold			

Lloyds
Party	Candidate	Votes	%
Labour	Bob Scott	2,157	67.79
Conservative	Miranda Harrison	914	28.72
Liberal Democrats	Judith Brown	111	3.49
Turnout		3182	30.19
Labour hold			

Oakley
Party	Candidate	Votes	%
Liberal Democrats	Chris Stanbra	948	32.51
Labour	Mary Butcher	911	31.24
Conservative	James Collier	899	30.83
UKIP	Keith Hudson	158	5.42
Turnout		2916	29.41
Liberal Democrats gain from Labour			

=== Daventry ===
Braunston & Crick
Party	Candidate	Votes	%	±%
Conservative	Malcolm Longley	1,876	50.15	16.12
Liberal Democrats	Andrew Simpson	1112	29.72	25.07
Labour	Ken Ritchie	753	20.13	−9.72
Turnout		3741	38.72	

Brixworth
Party	Candidate	Votes	%	±%
Conservative	Cecile Irving-Swift	2,345	65.19	14.16
Labour	Stuart Coe	515	14.32	1.1
Liberal Democrats	Kathryn Purchase	364	10.12	6.09
UKIP	Pamela Booker	216	6.01	−1.90
Green	James McKay-Mount	157	4.36	−2.31
Turnout		3597	39.33	
Conservative hold				

Daventry East
Party	Candidate	Votes	%	±%
Conservative	Amy Howard	1,411	61.78	18.2
Labour	Andrew Dabbs	714	31.26	5.48
Liberal Democrats	John Butlin	159	6.96	6.96
Turnout		2284	30.3	
Conservative hold				

Daventry West
Party	Candidate	Votes	%	±%
Conservative	Richard Auger	1,042	39.89	7.80
Labour	Wendy Randall	1012	38.74	7.86
UKIP	Gary Denby	353	13.51	−20.38
Liberal Democrats	Alan Knape	205	7.85	4.74
Turnout		2612	28.75	
Conservative gain from				

Long Buckby
Party	Candidate	Votes	%	±%
Conservative	Steve Osborne	2,128	57.64	11.62
Labour	Chris Myers	779	21.10	3.32
Liberal Democrats	Mike Cobbe	534	14.46	5.95
Green	Tom Harper	251	6.80	6.80
Turnout		3692	43.91	
Conservative hold				

Moulton
Party	Candidate	Votes	%	±%
Conservative	Judy Shephard	2,272	68.64	22.51
Labour	Caleb Mendonca	339	10.24	−4.68
Liberal Democrats	Rupert Knowles	290	8.76	4.62
Green	Kevin White	228	6.89	6.89
UKIP	Ian Dexter	181	5.47	−26.95
Turnout		3310	36.43	
Conservative hold				

Woodford & Weedon
Party	Candidate	Votes	%	±%
Conservative	Robin Brown	2,080	67.44	18.13
Labour	Callum Batchelor	586	19.00	4.34
Liberal Democrats	Simon Lytton	418	13.55	5.86
Turnout		3084	34.55	
Conservative hold				

=== East Northamptonshire ===
Higham Ferrers
Party	Candidate	Votes	%
Conservative	Glenn Harwood	1,762	60.12
Labour	Julie Sturgess	552	18.83
Liberal Democrats	Suzanna Austin	327	11.16
UKIP	David Hamblin	290	9.89
Turnout		2931	31.16
Conservative hold			

Irthlingborough
Party	Candidate	Votes	%
Conservative	Sylvia Hughes	1,748	50.24
Labour	Caroline Cross	796	22.88
Independent	Marika Hillson	760	21.85
Liberal Democrats	Robin Denton	175	5.03
Turnout		3479	35.15
Conservative hold			

Oundle
Party	Candidate	Votes	%
Conservative	Heather Smith	2,608	65.46
Labour	Leonie McCarthy	956	24.00
Liberal Democrats	George Smid	420	10.54
Turnout		3984	41.08
Conservative hold			

Raunds
Party	Candidate	Votes	%
Conservative	Dudley Hughes	1,747	60.12
Labour	Neil Harvey	562	19.34
Liberal Democrats	Will Cheung	353	12.15
Turnout		2906	34.48
Conservative hold			

Rushden Pemberton West
Party	Candidate	Votes	%
Conservative	Michael Tye	1,888	63.72
Labour	Dave Shuttle	619	20.89
UKIP	David Shephard	270	9.11
Liberal Democrats	David Hooton	186	6.28
Turnout		2963	31.35
Conservative hold			

Rushden South
Party	Candidate	Votes	%
Conservative	Andy Mercer	1,907	62.22
Labour	Stephen Allen	626	20.42
UKIP	James Beil	295	9.62
Liberal Democrats	Daniel Jones	237	7.73
Turnout		3065	27.52

Thrapston
Party	Candidate	Votes	%
Conservative	Wendy Brackenbury	2,651	66.79
Labour	Caroline Smith	653	16.45
Liberal Democrats	Tristan Denton	343	8.64
UKIP	Joseph Garner	207	5.22
Independent	John Smoker	115	2.90
Turnout		3969	37.97
Conservative hold			

=== Kettering ===
Burton & Broughton
Party	Candidate	Votes	%
Conservative	Chris Smith-Haynes	994	35.37
Independent	Christopher Groome	717	25.52
Labour	Samuel Nicholls	423	15.05
UKIP	Sam Watts	367	13.06
Liberal Democrats	Jenny Davies	241	8.58
Green	April Wright	68	2.42
Turnout		2810	30.83
Conservative gain from Independent			

Clover Hill
Party	Candidate	Votes	%
Conservative	Bill Parker	1,622	56.07
Labour	Jonathan West	705	24.37
Green	Kirsty Berry	256	8.85
UKIP	Louisa Murphy	182	6.29
Liberal Democrats	Mel Gosliga	128	4.42
Turnout		2893	33.38
Conservative hold			

Croyland & Swanspool
Party	Candidate	Votes	%
Conservative	Graham Lawman	1,311	52.00
Labour	Cari Spokes	765	30.35
UKIP	Terry Spencer	224	8.89
Liberal Democrats	Chris Nelson	125	4.96
Green	Simon Turner	96	3.81
Turnout		2521	26.09
Conservative hold			

Desborough
Party	Candidate	Votes	%
Conservative	Allan Matthews	1,584	42.04
Labour	Helen Wood	1,375	36.49
Liberal Democrats	Philip Rice	462	12.26
UKIP	Ian Clements	347	9.21
Turnout		3768	36.57
Conservative hold			

Ise
Party	Candidate	Votes	%
Conservative	Victoria Perry	1,469	46.49
Labour	David Padwick	794	25.13
UKIP	Jonathan Bullock	629	19.91
Liberal Democrats	Thomasin James	268	8.48
Turnout		3160	39.06
Conservative hold			

Northall
Party	Candidate	Votes	%
Labour	Mick Scrimshaw	1,261	42.88
Conservative	Larry Henson	1,232	41.89
UKIP	Stuart Farrant	232	7.89
Liberal Democrats	Chris McGlynn	216	7.34
Turnout		2941	30.17
Labour hold			

Rothwell & Mawsley
Party	Candidate	Votes	%
Conservative	James Hakewell	1,845	61.34
Labour	Stephen King	635	21.11
Liberal Democrats	Christopher Sheldrick	222	7.38
UKIP	Melvyn Norman	180	5.98
Green	Stevie Jones	126	4.19
Turnout		3008	32.49
Conservative hold			

Wicksteed
Party	Candidate	Votes	%
Conservative	Scott Edwards	1,423	47.09
Labour	Maggie Don	869	28.76
Liberal Democrats	David Phelan	428	14.16
UKIP	Jehad Soliman	186	6.15
Green	Jamie Wildman	116	3.84
Turnout		3022	32.15
Conservative hold			

Windmill
Party	Candidate	Votes	%
Labour	Eileen Hales	869	37.59
Conservative	Ollie Wyeth	848	36.68
UKIP	John Raffill	360	15.57
Green	James Dell	129	5.58
Liberal Democrats	Sabir Jones	106	4.58
Turnout		2312	27.1
Labour hold			

=== Northampton ===
Abington & Phippsville
Party	Candidate	Votes	%	±%
Labour	Danielle Stone	1,499	48.95	
Conservative	Anna King	856	27.96	
Liberal Democrats	Sharon Sawyer	283	9.24	
UKIP	Thomas Rich	271	8.85	
Green	Marcus Rock	153	5.00	
Turnout		3062	33.52	
Labour hold				

Boothville & Parklands
Party	Candidate	Votes	%	±%
Conservative	Mike Hallam	2,045	64.31	
Labour	Chris Fitchett	618	19.43	
Liberal Democrats	David Garlick	291	9.15	
UKIP	Martin Derosario	226	7.11	
Turnout		3180	36.15	
Conservative hold				

Castle
Party	Candidate	Votes	%	±%
Labour	Winston Strachan	1,507	65.15	+25.66
Conservative	James Hill	544	23.52	+8.67
Liberal Democrats	Tony Woods	262	11.33	+2.95
Turnout		2041	21.1	
Labour hold				

Dallington Spencer
Party	Candidate	Votes	%	±%
Labour	Gareth Eales	1,529	65.54	+19.43
Conservative	Paul Clark	549	23.53	+5.27
Liberal Democrats	Celia Burge	135	5.79	−18.52
Green	Paul Powerville	120	5.14	
Turnout		2333	28.38	
Labour hold				

Delapre & Rushmere
Party	Candidate	Votes	%	±%
Labour	Julie Davenport	1,004	36.23	+8.14
Conservative	Graham Walker	813	29.34	+4.28
Liberal Democrats	Brendan Glynane	690	24.90	−9.5
UKIP	Philip Copson	161	5.81	+5.81
Independent	Norman Adams	103	3.72	+3.72
Turnout		2771	32.46	
Labour gain from Liberal Democrats		Swing		

Duston East
Party	Candidate	Votes	%	±%
Conservative	Suresh Patel	1,381	47.57	+8.67
Labour	Dale Willis	926	31.90	+13.03
Independent	Dave Green	468	16.12	−14.17
Liberal Democrats	Rona Meredith	128	4.41	+0.7
Turnout		2903	31.21	
Conservative hold				

Duston West & St Crispin
Party	Candidate	Votes	%	±%
Conservative	Matthew Golby	1,539	60.83	−0.96
Labour	Alan Kingston	535	21.15	−4.16
UKIP	Mark Unwin	176	6.96	+6.96
Liberal Democrats	Julia Maddison	168	6.64	−6.25
Green	Scott Mabbutt	112	4.43	+4.43
Turnout		1908	27.48	
Conservative hold				

East Hunsbury & Shelfleys
Party	Candidate	Votes	%	±%
Conservative	Andre Savage	1,801	59.62	+18.47
Labour	Bob Burnell	557	18.44	+1.12
Liberal Democrats	Irene Markham	265	8.77	+2.48
UKIP	Mark Davis	258	8.54	−19.71
Green	Damon Boughen	140	4.63	
Turnout		3021	33.13	
Conservative hold				

Headlands
Party	Candidate	Votes	%	±%
Labour	Arthur McCutcheon	1,237	35.07	+5.56
Conservative	Samuel Shaw	1050	29.77	+5.14
Liberal Democrats	Martin Sawyer	841	23.84	+11.62
UKIP	Colin Bircher	399	11.31	−15.63
Turnout		3527	36.09	
Labour hold				

Kingsthorpe North
Party	Candidate	Votes	%	±%
Conservative	Sam Rumens	1,488	43.26	+12.5
UKIP	Thomas Appleyard	675	19.62	−14.19
Labour	Muna Cali	602	17.50	−4.92
Liberal Democrats	Wayne Casey	411	11.95	+2.09
Green	Steve Miller	264	7.67	+7.67
Turnout		3440	35.95	
Conservative gain from UKIP		Swing		

Kingsthorpe South
Party	Candidate	Votes	%	±%
Labour	Jane Birch	917	34.58	+8.08
Conservative	Arthur Newbury	750	28.28	+15.85
Liberal Democrats	Brian Hoare	706	26.62	−10.00
UKIP	John Howsam	279	10.52	−10.06
Turnout		2652		
Labour gain from Liberal Democrats		Swing		

Nene Valley
Party	Candidate	Votes	%	±%
Conservative	Lizzy Bowen	1,740	58.88	+21.37
Labour	Jani Nikesh	585	19.80	+3.61
Liberal Democrats	Paul Schofield	316	10.69	+6.5
UKIP	Rose Gibbins	314	10.63	−13.67
Turnout		2955	34.32	
Labour hold				

Riverside Park
Party	Candidate	Votes	%	±%
Conservative	Stephen Legg	1,925	55.13	+14.18
Labour	Mohammed Miah	736	21.08	−4.76
Liberal Democrats	Alastair Thomson	514	14.72	+8.32
UKIP	Ian Gibbins	317	9.08	
Turnout		3492		
Conservative hold				

Sixfields
Party	Candidate	Votes	%	±%
Conservative	Pinder Chauhan	1,162	35.89	+0.77
Liberal Democrats	Jill Hope	899	27.76	−9.61
Labour	Terri Eales	808	24.95	−2.57
UKIP	Simon Lamb	235	7.26	+7.26
Green	Denise Donaldson	134	4.14	
Turnout		3238	30.66	
Conservative gain from Liberal Democrats		Swing		

St George
Party	Candidate	Votes	%	±%
Labour	Rachel Cooley	999	40.30	+12.97
Liberal Democrats	Sarah Uldall	741	29.89	−1.52
Conservative	Pauline Woodhouse	554	22.35	+8.75
UKIP	Beverley Mennell	185	7.46	−15.04
Turnout		2479	29.51	
Labour gain from Liberal Democrats		Swing		

Talavera
Party	Candidate	Votes	%	±%
Liberal Democrats	Dennis Meredith	1,112	41.08	+2.2
Labour	Janice Duffy	857	31.66	+1.04
Conservative	Paul Dyball	490	18.10	+8.38
UKIP	John Allen	248	9.16	
Turnout		2707	28.57	
Liberal Democrats hold				

=== South Northamptonshire ===
Brackley
Party	Candidate	Votes	%	±%
Conservative	Fiona Baker	2,103	65.53	+29.15
Labour	Sophie Johnson	532	16.58	+0.45
Liberal Democrats	Mark Hedges	421	13.12	+4.29
UKIP	Nigel Wickens	153	4.77	−33.93
Turnout		3209	31.95	
Conservative gain from UKIP		Swing		

Bugbrooke
Party	Candidate	Votes	%	±%
Conservative	Adam Brown	2,760	69.36	+20.45
Labour	Shirley Waterhouse	565	14.20	+0.68
Green	Andy Clarke	346	8.70	+8.70
Liberal Democrats	Susan Morton	308	7.74	+2.18
Turnout		3979	40.53	

Deanshanger
Party	Candidate	Votes	%	±%
Conservative	Allen Walker	2,178	67.94	+4.89
Labour	Dave Tedford	617	19.25	−5.52
Liberal Democrats	Ruth Campbell	411	12.82	+0.62
Turnout		3206	35.95	

Hackleton & Grange Park
Party	Candidate	Votes	%	±%
Conservative	Michael Clarke	2,397	74.00	+31.70
Labour	Maggie McCutcheon	454	14.02	+1.79
Liberal Democrats	Katherine Chapanionek	388	11.98	+7.49
Turnout		3239	34.83	
Conservative hold				

Middleton Cheney
Party	Candidate	Votes	%	±%
Conservative	Rebecca Breese	2,258	66.06	+23.29
Labour	Richard Solesbury-Timms	647	18.93	+5.82
Liberal Democrats	Mark Allen	513	15.01	+6.24
Turnout		3418	39.16	
Conservative hold				

Silverstone
Party	Candidate	Votes	%	±%
Conservative	Ian Morris	2,766	71.34	+23.05
Liberal Democrats	Anna Mills	652	16.82	+8.58
Labour	Adrian Scandrett	459	11.84	−3.34
Turnout		3877	41.59	
Conservative hold				

Towcester & Roade
Party	Candidate	Votes	%	±%
Conservative	Adil Sadygov	1,676	46.07	+17.74
Liberal Democrats	Joe Jackson	1401	38.51	+2.92
Labour	Dan Lane	561	15.42	+3.58
Turnout		3638	38.41	
Conservative gain from Liberal Democrats		Swing		

=== Wellingborough ===
Brickhill & Queensway
Party	Candidate	Votes	%	±%
Conservative	Jonathan Ekins	1,356	48.53	+17.18
Labour	Elizabeth Coombe	972	34.79	+2.54
UKIP	Allan Shipham	277	9.91	−20.04
Green	Ben Hornett	124	4.44	+0.49
Liberal Democrats	Alan Window	65	2.33	+2.33
Turnout		2794	29.71	
Conservative gain from Labour		Swing		

Croyland & Swanspool
Party	Candidate	Votes	%	±%
Conservative	Grayham Lawman	1,311	52.00	+14.15
Labour	Cari Spokes	765	30.35	−1.61
UKIP	Terry Spencer	224	8.89	−15.33
Liberal Democrats	Chris Nelson	125	4.95	+4.96
Green	Simon Turner	96	3.81	+3.81
Turnout		2521	26.09	

Earls Barton
Party	Candidate	Votes	%	±%
Conservative	Rob Gough	2,749	70.02	+24.03
Labour	Nick Chapman	1007	25.65	+4.76
Liberal Democrats	Grant Bowles	170	4.33	−0.43
Turnout		3926	38.73	
Conservative hold				

Finedon
Party	Candidate	Votes	%	±%
Conservative	Gill Mercer	1,476	48.81	+14.81
Labour	Steve Ayland	1058	34.99	+2.47
UKIP	Bill Cross	259	8.56	−21.34
Liberal Democrats	John Weaver	231	7.64	+4.04
Turnout		3024	29.68	
Conservative hold				

Hatton Park
Party	Candidate	Votes	%	±%
Conservative	Malcolm Waters	2,062	59.72	
Labour	Tony Aslam	772	22.36	
UKIP	David Matuk	245	7.10	
Liberal Democrats	Stuart Simons	220	6.37	
Green	Jonathan Hornett	154	4.46	
Turnout		3453	33.1	
Conservative hold				

Irchester
Party	Candidate	Votes	%	±%
Conservative	Martin Griffiths	2,020	63.24	+21.92
Labour	Kevin Watts	800	25.05	−10.78
UKIP	Mark Gee	210	6.57	−16.28
Liberal Democrats	Norman Jones	164	5.13	+5.13
Turnout		3194	36.74	
Conservative hold				
