= 2013 Northamptonshire County Council election =

2013 UK local government election

← 2009	2 May 2013	2017 →

All 57 seats in the Northamptonshire County Council 29 seats needed for a majority
	First party	Second party
Party	Conservative	Labour
Seats won	36	11
Seat change	▼20	▲5
Popular vote	59,667	43,149
Percentage	36.5%	26.4%
	Third party	Fourth party
Party	Liberal Democrats	UKIP
Seats won	6	3
Seat change	▼3	▲3
Popular vote	14,687	36,607
Percentage	9.0%	22.4%
- Map showing the results of the 2013 Northamptonshire County Council elections.
Council control before election
Conservative
Council control after election
Conservative

An election to Northamptonshire County Council took place on 2 May 2013 as part of the 2013 United Kingdom local elections. Following a boundary review, the number of county councillors was reduced from 73 to 57 from this election. (Note: Accordingly, the Council's expert opinion on the matter of comparison of any electoral division results before and after is expressed as "This makes division-by-division comparisons between the result of this election and the previous election very difficult. For this reason, we will not be presenting the information in terms of which parties have held or gained/lost seats." However a proportionate measure of the results provides the following exact seat distribution, which rounded to one decimal place, is used for the overall measure of parties strengths: Conservatives:43.7 Labour:4.7 Liberal Democrats:7.0 Independent:1.5 UKIP:0) All members were elected by first-past-the-post voting from single-member electoral divisions for a four-year term of office. The Conservative Party held on to their overall majority, having held overall control of the council since 2005.

All locally registered electors (British, Irish, Commonwealth and European Union citizens) who were aged 18 or over on Thursday 2 May 2013 were entitled to vote in the local elections. Those who were temporarily away from their ordinary address (for example, away working, on holiday, in student accommodation or in hospital) were also entitled to vote in the local elections, although those who had moved abroad and registered as overseas electors cannot vote in the local elections. It is possible to register to vote at more than one address (such as a university student who had a term-time address and lives at home during holidays) at the discretion of the local Electoral Register Office, but it remains an offence to vote more than once in the same local government election.

== Summary ==
The election saw the Conservatives maintain overall control of the council with a reduced majority of 8 seats. The Labour Party regained their status as the council's official opposition group with 11 seats, a net gain of five. The Liberal Democrats had 6 members elected, a net loss of three. UKIP achieved 3 council seats, while one independent candidate was elected.

== Results ==
Northamptonshire County Council election result 2013
Party	Seats	Gains	Losses	Net gain/loss	Seats %	Votes %	Votes	+/−
Conservative	36			-20	63.16	36.7	61,128	-14.6
Labour	11			+5	19.30	26.1	43,479	+6.6
Liberal Democrats	6			-3	10.53	8.7	14,494	-12.1
UKIP	3	3	0	+3	5.26	22.8	37,874	+22.8
Independent	1	0	1	-1	1.75	4.1	6,875	-2.0
Green	0	0	0	0	0.00	1.5	2,500	-0.8

== Results by division ==
=== Corby ===
Corby Rural
Party	Candidate	Votes	%
Conservative	Stan Heggs	738	28.1
UKIP	Margot Parker	640	24.4
Labour	Jonathan West	633	24.1
Liberal Democrats	Bob Riley	614	23.4
Turnout		2625	39.81

Corby West
Party	Candidate	Votes	%
Labour	Julie Brookfield	1,916	59.6
Conservative	Eve Howitt	557	17.3
Independent	Stuart McKay	412	12.8
BNP	Marc Riddell	226	7.0
Liberal Democrats	Philip Bromhall	104	3.2
Turnout		3215	32.17

Kingswood
Party	Candidate	Votes	%
Labour	John McGhee	1,850	69.9
Conservative	Helen Harrison	368	13.9
BNP	Stella Wright	245	9.2
Green	Steven Scrutton	110	4.1
Liberal Democrats	Eddie McGeown	84	3.2
Turnout		2657	25.48

Lloyds
Party	Candidate	Votes	%
Labour	Bob Scott	1,923	61.7
UKIP	Fred Parker	670	21.5
Conservative	Christopher Woolmer	392	12.6
BNP	Gordon Riddell	70	2.2
Liberal Democrats	Terri Meechan	60	1.9
Turnout		3115	29.2

Oakley
Party	Candidate	Votes	%
Labour	Mary Butcher	1,110	38.4
UKIP	Peter McGowan	658	22.8
Liberal Democrats	Chris Stanbra	565	19.6
Conservative	David Sims	518	17.9
BNP	James Campbell	36	1.2
Turnout		2887	30.11

=== Daventry ===
Braunston & Crick
Party	Candidate	Votes	%
Conservative	Steve Slatter	1,008	34.0
UKIP	Derek Whitaker	932	31.5
Labour	Abigail Campbell	884	29.8
Liberal Democrats	Pamela Varnsverry	138	4.7
Turnout		2962	32.1

Brixworth
Party	Candidate	Votes	%
Conservative	Catherine Boardman	1,683	51.0
UKIP	Pamela Booker	826	25.0
Labour	Robert MaNally	436	13.2
Green	Steve Whiffen	221	6.7
Liberal Democrats	Liz Pym	133	4.0
Turnout		3299	36.33

Daventry East
Party	Candidate	Votes	%
Conservative	Alan Hills	896	43.6
UKIP	Eric Macanndrais	576	28.0
Labour	Ken Ritchie	530	25.8
Independent	Alan Gordon†	54	2.6
Turnout		2056	27.57

†Trade Unions and Socialists against cuts

Daventry West
Party	Candidate	Votes	%
UKIP	Adam Collyer	721	33.9
Conservative	Chris Long	683	32.1
Labour	Wendy Randall	657	30.9
Liberal Democrats	Luisa Pereira	66	3.1
Turnout		2127	22.57

Long Buckby
Party	Candidate	Votes	%
Conservative	Steve Osborne	1,421	46.0
UKIP	Beverley Rundle	804	12.0
Labour	Christopher Lee	549	17.8
Liberal Democrats	Neil Farmer	263	8.5
Independent	Tom Price†	51	1.7
Turnout		3088	36.36

†Trade Unions and Socialists against cuts

Moulton
Party	Candidate	Votes	%
Conservative	Judy Shephard	1,447	46.1
UKIP	Ian Dexter	1,017	32.4
Labour	Mark Maryan	468	14.9
Liberal Democrats	Jacqueline Glynane	130	4.1
CPA	Timothy Webb	75	2.4
Turnout		3137	36.66

Woodford & Weedon
Party	Candidate	Votes	%
Conservative	Robin Brown	1,295	49.3
UKIP	Debra Perry	705	26.8
Labour	Ron Pursey	385	14.7
Liberal Democrats	Christopher Salaman	202	7.7
Independent	Bea Price†	39	1.5
Turnout		2626	29.73

†Trade Unions and Socialists against cuts

=== East Northamptonshire ===
Higham Ferrers
Party	Candidate	Votes	%
Conservative	Derek Lawson	1,184	44.2
UKIP	Jo Faulkner	667	26.0
Labour	Angela White	385	14.4
Independent	Richard Gell	299	11.2
Liberal Democrats	Joshua Dixon	116	4.3
Turnout		2681	29.44

Irthlingborough
Party	Candidate	Votes	%
Conservative	Sylvia Hughes	1,436	48.0
Labour	Jon Gray	1,263	42.2
BNP	John Whitestone	295	9.9
Turnout		2994	31.04

Oundle
Party	Candidate	Votes	%
Conservative	Heather Smith	1,849	55.6
UKIP	Linda Saunders	677	20.4
Labour	Chris Cox	573	17.2
Liberal Democrats	George Smid	225	6.8
Turnout		3324	35.78

Raunds
Party	Candidate	Votes	%
Conservative	Dudley Hughes	1,351	51.9
Labour	Pauline Ellis	1,029	39.5
Liberal Democrats	Garth Ratcliffe	225	8.6
Turnout		2605	31.24

Rushden Pemberton West
Party	Candidate	Votes	%
Conservative	Michael Tye	1,366	47.2
UKIP	David Hamblin	741	25.6
Labour	Keith Cox	709	24.5
Liberal Democrats	Anthony Woods	80	2.8
Turnout		2896	30.4

Rushden South
Party	Candidate	Votes	%
Conservative	Andy Mercer	1,386	48.0
UKIP	Dan Blair	725	25.1
Labour	Les Rolfe	631	21.9
Liberal Democrats	David Hooton	144	5.0
Turnout		2886	27.89

Thrapston
Party	Candidate	Votes	%
Conservative	Wendy Brackenbury	1,380	37.9
UKIP	Joseph Garner	930	25.5
Labour	Gordon Stewart	570	15.6
Independent	Bob Seery	393	10.8
Independent	Peter Baden	128	3.5
Green	Thomas Wand	124	3.4
Liberal Democrats	David Burgess	119	3.3
Turnout		3644	35.29

=== Kettering ===
Burton & Broughton
Party	Candidate	Votes	%
Independent	Christopher Groome	799	34.1
Conservative	Steve Bellamy	609	26.0
UKIP	Daniel Perkins	566	24.1
Labour	Ian Watts	319	13.6
Liberal Democrats	David Garlick	51	2.2
Turnout		2344	28.55

Clover Hill
Party	Candidate	Votes	%
Conservative	Bill Parker	1,208	43.2
Labour	Harvey Bhandal	830	29.7
UKIP	Eddie Brace	566	20.3
English Democrat	Victoria Hilling	117	4.2
Liberal Democrats	John Crake	73	2.6
Turnout		2794	30.94

Croyland & Swanspool
Party	Candidate	Votes	%
Conservative	Graham Lawman	944	37.9
Labour	Tony Aslam	797	32.0
UKIP	Peter Jakeways	604	24.2
English Democrat	Tony Spencer	149	6.0
Turnout		2494	28.06

Desborough
Party	Candidate	Votes	%
Conservative	Allan Matthews	1,014	28.2
Independent	Belinda Humfrey	952	26.5
UKIP	Paul Oakden	635	17.7
Labour	John Padwick	610	17.0
English Democrat	Kevin Sills	190	5.3
Liberal Democrats	Stanley Freeman	124	3.4
BNP	Clive Skinner	71	2.0
Turnout		3596	35.25

Hatton Park
Party	Candidate	Votes	%
Conservative	Malcolm Waters	1,306	39.6
UKIP	Allan Shipham	884	26.8
Labour	Andrea Watts	776	23.5
English Democrat	Rob Walker	133	4.0
Green	Emma Hornett	111	3.4
Liberal Democrats	Norman Jones	89	2.7
Turnout		3299	32.5

Ise
Party	Candidate	Votes	%
Conservative	Jim Harker	1,307	40.5
UKIP	Jonathan Bullock	1,133	35.1
Labour	Harjinder Singh	671	20.8
Liberal Democrats	Alan Window	120	3.7
Turnout		3231	38.85

Northall
Party	Candidate	Votes	%
Labour	Mick Scrimshaw	1,025	38.3
Conservative	Larry Henson	961	35.9
UKIP	Dan Gaskin	597	22.3
Liberal Democrats	Portia Wilson	94	3.5
Turnout		2677	26.96

Rothwell & Mawsley
Party	Candidate	Votes	%
Conservative	James Hakewell	1,172	37.9
UKIP	Alan Pote	971	31.4
Labour	Margaret Draper	840	27.2
Liberal Democrats	Philip Rice	110	3.6
Turnout		3093	34.42

Wickstead
Party	Candidate	Votes	%
Conservative	Russel Roberts	1,113	39.6
UKIP	Jehad Soliman	790	28.1
Labour	Maureen Shram	775	27.6
Liberal Democrats	Christopher McGlynn	135	4.8
Turnout		2813	30.58

Windmill
Party	Candidate	Votes	%
Labour	Eileen Hales	859	36.7
UKIP	John Raffill	704	30.1
Conservative	Chris Smith-Haynes	554	23.7
English Democrat	Derek Hilling	132	5.6
Liberal Democrats	David Tate	91	3.9
Turnout		2340	26.89

=== Northampton ===
Abington & Phippsville
Party	Candidate	Votes	%
Labour	Danielle Stone	885	31.8
Conservative	Rebecca Harding	835	30.0
Liberal Democrats	Brian Hoare	452	16.3
UKIP	Karim Ayoubi	335	12.1
Green	Jac Higgs	273	9.8
Turnout		2780	20.19

Boothville & Parklands
Party	Candidate	Votes	%
Conservative	Mike Hallam	1,513	47.3
UKIP	Colin Lill	732	22.9
Labour	Ben Wesson	671	21.0
Liberal Democrats	Mike Torpy	194	6.1
Green	Anthony Lochmuller	91	2.8
Turnout		3201	35.7

Castle
Party	Candidate	Votes	%
Labour	Winston Strachan	806	39.5
Green	Tony Clarke	437	21.4
Conservative	Chris Kellett	303	14.8
UKIP	Dusan Torbica	273	13.4
Liberal Democrats	Aktar Hussein	171	8.4
Independent	Mohammed Azir	51	2.5
Turnout		2041	21.1

Dallington Spencer
Party	Candidate	Votes	%
Labour	Gareth Eales	937	46.1
Liberal Democrats	Jenny Conroy	494	24.3
Conservative	Luke Graystone	371	18.3
Green	Eamonn Fitzpatrick	230	11.3
Turnout		2032	23.42

Delapre & Rushmere
Party	Candidate	Votes	%
Liberal Democrats	Brendan Glynane	851	34.4
Labour	Rhea Keehn	695	28.1
Conservative	Andrew Kilbride	620	25.1
BNP	Mark Plowman	216	8.7
Independent	Steve White†	92	3.7
Turnout		2474	27.52

†Trade Unions & Socialists against cuts

Duston East
Party	Candidate	Votes	%
Conservative	Suresh Patel	1,039	38.9
Independent	Dave Green†	809	30.3
Labour	Ulric Gravesande	504	18.9
Green	Hannah Gibson	220	8.2
Liberal Democrats	Michael Quinn	99	3.7
Turnout		2671	28.91

†Northampton Save our Services

Duston West & St Crispin
Party	Candidate	Votes	%
Conservative	Matthew Golby	1,179	61.8
Labour	Beverly Mennell	483	25.3
Liberal Democrats	Julia Lynne	246	12.9
Turnout		1908	27.48

East Hunsbury & Shelfleys
Party	Candidate	Votes	%
Conservative	Andre Gonzalez de Savage	1,126	41.2
UKIP	John Howsam	773	28.3
Labour	Bob Burnell	474	17.3
Green	Gary Burgess	191	7.0
Liberal Democrats	Charles Markham	172	6.3
Turnout		2736	29.16

Headlands
Party	Candidate	Votes	%
Labour	Arthur McCutcheon	894	29.5
UKIP	Colin Bricher	816	26.9
Conservative	Matt Lynch	746	24.6
Liberal Democrats	Marion Minney	370	12.2
Green	Marcus Rock	164	5.4
BNP	Marc Whitestone	39	1.3
Turnout		3029	31.34

Kingthorpe North
Party	Candidate	Votes	%
UKIP	Michael Brown	1,042	33.8
Conservative	Mary Markham	948	30.8
Labour	Clement Chunga	691	22.4
Liberal Democrats	Trini Crake	304	9.9
BNP	Peter Whitestone	97	3.1
Turnout		3082	31.71

Kingthorpe South
Party	Candidate	Votes	%
Liberal Democrats	Sally Beardsworth	872	33.8
Labour	Zoe Smith	631	26.5
UKIP	Colin Pearson	490	20.6
Conservative	John Yates	296	12.4
Green	David Phillips	92	3.9
Turnout		2381	24.11

Nene Valley
Party	Candidate	Votes	%
Conservative	Phil Larratt	948	37.5
UKIP	Alan Price	614	24.3
Independent	Liam Costello	450	17.8
Labour	Steven Brooks	409	16.2
Liberal Democrats	Cerri Glynane	106	4.2
Turnout		2527	29.44

Riverside Park
Party	Candidate	Votes	%
Conservative	Stephen Legg	1,298	40.9
UKIP	Kevin Reeve	850	26.8
Labour	Janice Duffy	819	25.8
Liberal Democrats	Richard Arterton	203	6.4
Turnout		3170	31.95

Sixfields
Party	Candidate	Votes	%
Liberal Democrats	Jill Hope	865	37.4
Conservative	Brandon Eldred	813	35.1
Labour	Viv Dams	637	27.5
Turnout		2315	24.25

St George
Party	Candidate	Votes	%
Liberal Democrats	Sarah Uldall	771	31.4
Labour	Rufia Ashraf	671	27.3
UKIP	Robin Fruish	553	22.5
Conservative	Michael O'Connor	334	13.6
Green	Julie Hawkins	126	5.1
Turnout		2455	27.06

Talavera
Party	Candidate	Votes	%
Liberal Democrats	Dennis Meredith	1,040	38.9
Labour	Ifty Choudary	819	30.6
UKIP	John Allen	556	20.8
Conservative	Sheila Roberts	260	9.7
Turnout		2675	27.24

=== South Northamptonshire ===
Brackley
Party	Candidate	Votes	%
UKIP	Jim Broomfield	1,012	38.7
Conservative	Ron Sawbridge	952	36.4
Labour	Douglas Barry	422	16.1
Liberal Democrats	Jane Hollis	231	8.8
Turnout		2617	25.63

Bugbrooke
Party	Candidate	Votes	%
Conservative	Joan Kirkbride	1,758	48.9
UKIP	Wes Charlesworth	1,150	32.0
Labour	Lynda Davies	486	13.5
Liberal Democrats	Shaun Hope	200	5.6
Turnout		3594	35.03

Deanshanger
Party	Candidate	Votes	%
Conservative	Allen Walker	1,708	63.0
Labour	John Rawlings	671	24.8
Liberal Democrats	Lisa Samiotis	330	12.2
Turnout		2709	33.44

Hackleton & Grange Park
Party	Candidate	Votes	%
Conservative	Michael Clarke	1,553	42.3
UKIP	Tom Rubython	1,504	41.0
Labour	Ian Grant	449	12.2
Liberal Democrats	Angela Paterson	165	4.5
Turnout		3671	36.59

Middleton Cheney
Party	Candidate	Votes	%
Conservative	Ken Melling	1,165	42.8
UKIP	Stafford Nash	963	35.4
Labour	Bernard Rooney	357	13.1
Liberal Democrats	Martin Johns	239	8.8
Turnout		2724	30.55

Silverstone
Party	Candidate	Votes	%
Conservative	Ian Morris	1,676	48.3
UKIP	Peter Conquest	982	28.3
Labour	Lucy Mills	527	15.2
Liberal Democrats	Scott Collins	286	8.2
Turnout		3471	34.74

Hackleton & Grange Park
Party	Candidate	Votes	%
Conservative	Michael Clarke	1,553	42.3
UKIP	Tom Rubython	1,504	41.0
Labour	Ian Grant	449	12.2
Liberal Democrats	Angela Paterson	165	4.5
Turnout		3671	36.59

Towcester & Roade
Party	Candidate	Votes	%
Liberal Democrats	Chris Lofts	1,226	35.6
Conservative	Andrew Grant	976	28.3
UKIP	Barry Mahoney	799	23.2
Labour	Mike Caseman-Jones	408	11.8
BNP	John Hughes	36	1.0
Turnout		3445	33.58

=== Wellingborough ===
Brickhill & Queensway
Party	Candidate	Votes	%
Labour	Elizabeth Coombe	899	32.2
Conservative	David Dean	874	31.3
UKIP	Michael Curtis	835	29.9
Green	Jonathan Hornett	110	3.9
BNP	David Robinson	70	2.5
Turnout		2788	30.47

Croyland & Swanspool
Party	Candidate	Votes	%
Conservative	Grayham Lawman	944	37.9
Labour	Tony Aslam	797	32.0
UKIP	Peter Jakeways	604	24.2
English Democrat	Tony Spencer	149	6.0
Turnout		2494	28.06

Earls Barton
Party	Candidate	Votes	%
Conservative	Paul Bell	1,768	46.0
UKIP	Debra Elderton	1,090	28.4
Labour	Kevin Watts	802	20.9
Liberal Democrats	Daniel Jones	183	4.8
Turnout		3843	39.28

Finedon
Party	Candidate	Votes	%
Conservative	Peter Bhupendra	997	34.0
Labour	James Ashton	944	32.5
UKIP	Gary Evans	868	29.9
Liberal Democrats	John Weaver	104	3.6
Turnout		2903	31.88

Irchester
Party	Candidate	Votes	%
Conservative	Sue Homer	1,429	41.3
Labour	Tim Maguire	1,239	35.8
UKIP	Tony Giddings	790	22.8
Turnout		3458	40.39

== Interim by-elections and defections ==
Between 2009 and 2013, the only change to council composition were defections from the Conservatives who lost four councillors: one to UKIP, one to the Liberal Democrats and two became independent.

== Notes and references ==
Notes
