= 2001 Northamptonshire County Council election =

2001 UK local government election

← 1997	7 June 2001	2005 →

All 73 seats in the Northamptonshire County Council 37 seats needed for a majority
	First party	Second party	Third party
Party	Labour	Conservative	Liberal Democrats
Seats won	39	32	2
Popular vote	130,793	131,779	34,970
Percentage	43.7%	44.1%	11.7%
- Map showing the results of the 2001 Northamptonshire County Council elections.
Council control before election
Labour
Council control after election
Labour

The 2001 Northamptonshire County Council election took place on 7 June 2001 to elect members of Northamptonshire County Council, England. The whole council was up for election and the Labour Party retained overall control of the council, which it had held since 1993.

== Division by Division Results by County Borough ==
- In order of number of votes with the winning candidate first

=== Corby Borough ===

Corby Central Division
Party	Candidate	Votes	%
Labour	M. Bullock	2,446	69.3
Conservative	R. Tustin	667	18.9
Liberal Democrats	P. McGowan	418	11.8
Majority		1,779	50.4
Turnout		3,531	57.2

Corby Rural Division
Party	Candidate	Votes	%
Labour	J.Wade	2,523	56.6
Conservative	S. Heggs	1,938	43.4
Majority		585	13.1
Turnout		4,461	65.6

Danesholme Division
Party	Candidate	Votes	%
Labour	J. McKellar	2,090	55.6
Conservative	B. Howard	937	24.9
Liberal Democrats	C. Stanbra	730	19.4
Majority		1,153	30.7
Turnout		3,757	60.9

Kingswood Division
Party	Candidate	Votes	%
Labour	A. Bell	2,659	72.6
Conservative	A. Girvin	1,002	27.4
Majority		1,657	45.3
Turnout		3,661	53.7

Lloyds Division
Party	Candidate	Votes	%
Labour	J. Kane	3,035	73.8
Conservative	G. Ellenton	1,075	26.2
Majority		1,960	47.7
Turnout		4,110	64.4

Shire Lodge Division
Party	Candidate	Votes	%
Labour	J. Forshaw	3,139	72.5
Conservative	C. Woolmer	1,190	27.5
Majority		1,949	45.0
Turnout		4,329	60.6

=== Daventry District ===
Braunston Division
Party	Candidate	Votes	%
Conservative	E. Williams	2,829	58.7
Labour	K. Ritchie	1,994	41.3
Majority		835	17.3
Turnout		4,823	66.7

Brixworth Division
Party	Candidate	Votes	%
Conservative	J. Millar	2,632	51.9
Labour	M. Davenport	1,223	24.1
Liberal Democrats	M. Nice	1,216	24.0
Majority		1,409	27.8
Turnout		5,071	68.5

Daventry East Division
Party	Candidate	Votes	%
Labour	J. Penrose	2,005	53.7
Conservative	S. Osborne	1,731	46.3
Majority		274	7.3
Turnout		3,736	53.7

Daventry West Division
Party	Candidate	Votes	%
Labour	O. Loud	2,355	60.8
Conservative	Annette Dunn	1,521	39.2
Majority		834	21.5
Turnout		3,876	51.6

Moulton Division
Party	Candidate	Votes	%
Conservative	J. Shephard	2,310	55.0
Labour	M. Hanly	1,113	26.5
Labour	B. Luck	774	18.4
Majority		1,197	28.5
Turnout		4,197	69.5

Uplands Division
Party	Candidate	Votes	%
Conservative	A. Tebbutt	3,004	58.2
Labour	J. Corkill	1,313	25.4
Green	J. Hurst	844	16.4
Majority		1,691	32.8
Turnout		5,161	71.2

Woodford & Weedon Division
Party	Candidate	Votes	%
Conservative	Gina Ogden	2,531	60.5
Labour	Malcolm Adcock	1,650	39.5
Majority		881	21.1
Turnout		4,181	62.9

=== East Northamptonshire District ===
Higham Ferrers Division
Party	Candidate	Votes	%
Conservative	D. Lawson	2,549	55.5
Labour	A. Dunn	2,046	44.5
Majority		503	10.9
Turnout		4,595	67.3

Irthlingborough Division
Party	Candidate	Votes	%
Labour	D. Lee	2,141	50.2
Conservative	S. Hobbs	2,123	49.8
Majority		18	0.4
Turnout		4,264	61.2

Oundle Division
Party	Candidate	Votes	%
Conservative	C. Reichhold	2,452	51.1
Labour	J. Brookfield	1,845	38.5
Independent	J. Smoker	497	10.4
Majority		607	12.7
Turnout		4,794	70.3

Prebendal Division
Party	Candidate	Votes	%
Conservative	P. Padley	2,920	70.3
Labour	R. Whitehad	1,233	29.7
Majority		1,687	71.4
Turnout		4,153	40.6

Raunds Division
Party	Candidate	Votes	%
Labour	G. Sharman	2,011	50.9
Conservative	S. Roberts	1,937	49.1
Majority		74	1.9
Turnout		3,948	61.2

Rushden East Division
Party	Candidate	Votes	%
Labour	L. Cox	1,703	44.0
Conservative	C. Wood	1,641	42.4
Liberal Democrats	David Hooton	529	13.7
Majority		62	1.6
Turnout		3,873	56.5

Rushden South Division
Party	Candidate	Votes	%
Conservative	M. Tye	2,363	54.6
Labour	L. Rolfe	1,964	45.4
Majority		399	9.2
Turnout		4,327	62.7

Rushden West Division
Party	Candidate	Votes	%
Labour	F. Jones	1,883	52.4
Conservative	R. Pinnock	1,712	47.6
Majority		171	4.8
Turnout		3,595	57.7

Thrapston Division
Party	Candidate	Votes	%
Conservative	B. Seery	2,529	57.1
Labour	M. Whiteman	1,578	35.6
UKIP	P. Baden	322	7.3
Majority		951	21.5
Turnout		4,429	67.6

=== Kettering Borough ===
Brambleside Division
Party	Candidate	Votes	%
Labour	A. Chambers	1,784	44.2
Conservative	G. Smith	1,713	42.4
Liberal Democrats	J. Richardson	540	13.4
Majority		71	1.8
Turnout		4,037	69.9

Burton Division
Party	Candidate	Votes	%
Conservative	C. Lamb	1,709	38.9
Labour	A. Gordon	1,657	37.7
Liberal Democrats	K. Simons	1,026	23.4
Majority		52	1.2
Turnout		4,392	67.0

Desborough Division
Party	Candidate	Votes	%
Labour	D. Coe	2,079	47.9
Conservative	B. Glynane	1,861	42.9
Liberal Democrats	M. Hill	401	9.2
Majority		218	5.0
Turnout		4,341	69.7

Grange Division
Party	Candidate	Votes	%
Labour	R. Mayhew	2,095	62.6
Conservative	K. Marsh	911	27.2
Liberal Democrats	F. Peacock	340	10.2
Majority		1,184	35.4
Turnout		3,346	58.9

Ise Division
Party	Candidate	Votes	%
Conservative	R. Baker	1,824	43.1
Labour	G. Marshall	1,806	42.7
Liberal Democrats	V. McGlynn	604	14.3
Majority		18	0.4
Turnout		4,234	67.9

Kettering Central Division
Party	Candidate	Votes	%
Labour	I. Watts	2,153	52.9
Conservative	J. Harker	1,372	33.7
Liberal Democrats	C. McGlynn	543	13.3
Majority		781	19.2
Turnout		4,068	60.8

Kettering Rural Division
Party	Candidate	Votes	%
Conservative	J. Harker	3,015	56.6
Labour	R. Smith	1,553	29.2
Liberal Democrats	J. Prentice	755	14.2
Majority		1,461	27.5
Turnout		5,323	74.9

Rothwell Division
Party	Candidate	Votes	%
Labour	D. Whyte	1,996	53.9
Conservative	M. Spendlove	1,704	46.1
Majority		292	7.9
Turnout		3,700	66.8

St Andrews and St Peters Division
Party	Candidate	Votes	%
Labour	J. West	2,285	55.2
Conservative	T. Freer	1,858	44.8
Majority		427	10.3
Turnout		4,143	59.9

Wicksteed Division
Party	Candidate	Votes	%
Conservative	W. Parker	1,917	40.2
Labour	J. Connolly	1,851	38.8
Liberal Democrats	J. Coleman	1,000	21.0
Majority		66	1.4
Turnout		4,768	68.4

=== Northampton Borough ===
Abington Division
Party	Candidate	Votes	%
Labour	M. Boss	1,780	49.7
Conservative	J. Ashby	965	26.9
Liberal Democrats	C. Markham	839	23.4
Majority		815	22.7
Turnout		3,584	56.0

Billing Division
Party	Candidate	Votes	%
Labour	W. Strachan	1,500	43.6
Conservative	J. Duncan	1,377	40.0
Liberal Democrats	L. Felstead	566	16.4
Majority		123	3.6
Turnout		3,443	51.8

Boughton Green Division
Party	Candidate	Votes	%
Labour	B. Kirby	1,661	39.2
Conservative	I. McCann	1,298	30.6
Liberal Democrats	J. Yates	1,282	30.2
Majority		363	8.6
Turnout		4,241	62.6

Castle Division
Party	Candidate	Votes	%
Labour	R. Dickie	2,023	60.8
Conservative	E. Barham	677	20.3
Liberal Democrats	G. Bowles	528	15.9
Independent	P. Harrisson	100	3.0
Majority		1,346	40.4
Turnout		3,328	47.6

Delapre Division
Party	Candidate	Votes	%
Labour	C. Kalyan	1,591	46.7
Liberal Democrats	B. Glynane	923	27.1
Conservative	M. Hill	893	26.2
Majority		668	19.6
Turnout		3,407	55.5

Eastfield Division
Party	Candidate	Votes	%
Labour	M. Thomas	2,007	50.9
Conservative	L. Percival	1,205	30.6
Liberal Democrats	B. Dee	728	18.5
Majority		802	20.4
Turnout		2,855	58.4

East Hunsbury Division
Party	Candidate	Votes	%
Conservative	J. Nunn	1,789	46.7
Labour	T. Bailey	1,343	35.0
Liberal Democrats	S. Battison	700	18.3
Majority		446	11.6
Turnout		3,832	57.8

Ecton Brook Division
Party	Candidate	Votes	%
Labour	P. Concannon	1,331	45.5
Conservative	J. Lane	1,124	38.4
Liberal Democrats	R. Baldwin	641	16.0
Majority		207	7.1
Turnout		2,964	54.1

Headlands Division
Party	Candidate	Votes	%
Labour	V. Dams	1,562	35.9
Conservative	G. Hawker	1,440	33.1
Liberal Democrats	S. Hope	1,349	31.0
Majority		122	2.8
Turnout		4,351	66.8

Kingsley Division
Party	Candidate	Votes	%
Labour	J. Dixon	1,592	40.4
Liberal Democrats	R. Church	1,517	38.5
Conservative	G. Austin	829	21.1
Majority		75	1.9
Turnout		3,938	55.6

Kingsthorpe Division
Party	Candidate	Votes	%
Liberal Democrats	S. Beardsworth	1,844	45.2
Labour	F. Wire	1,397	34.2
Conservative	M. Miah	840	20.6
Majority		447	11.0
Turnout		4,081	59.6

Lumbertubs Division
Party	Candidate	Votes	%
Labour	M. Young	1,618	55.9
Conservative	B. Eldred	782	27.0
Liberal Democrats	M. Taylor	492	17.0
Majority		836	28.9
Turnout		2,892	47.6

Nene Valley Division
Party	Candidate	Votes	%
Conservative	C. Lill	2,208	52.5
Labour	J. Lineker	1,288	30.6
Liberal Democrats	R. Matthews	711	16.9
Majority		920	21.9
Turnout		4,207	66.3

New Duston Division
Party	Candidate	Votes	%
Conservative	E. Tavener	1,958	46.6
Labour	P. Evans	1,638	39.0
Liberal Democrats	R. Cant	608	14.5
Majority		320	7.6
Turnout		4,204	64.0

Old Duston Division
Party	Candidate	Votes	%
Conservative	D. Edwards	1,802	44.0
Labour	A. Kingston	1,756	42.9
Liberal Democrats	C. Squires	536	13.1
Majority		46	1.1
Turnout		4,094	63.6

Parklands Division
Party	Candidate	Votes	%
Conservative	W. Massey	1,733	41.4
Labour	F. Lilley	1,685	40.3
Liberal Democrats	I. Wright	767	18.3
Majority		48	1.1
Turnout		4,185	66.9

Spencer Division
Party	Candidate	Votes	%
Labour	J. Bains	1,696	59.4
Conservative	B. Wright	694	24.3
Liberal Democrats	I. Markham	465	16.3
Majority		1,002	35.1
Turnout		2,855	47.4

St Crispin Division
Party	Candidate	Votes	%
Labour	A. McCutcheon	1,545	51.0
Conservative	D. Clark	864	28.5
Liberal Democrats	M. Hoare	535	17.7
Independent	T. Harvey	83	2.7
Majority		681	22.5
Turnout		3,007	47.9

St David Division
Party	Candidate	Votes	%
Labour	J. Gardner	1,530	47.0
Liberal Democrats	N. Felstead	967	29.7
Conservative	J. Cartwright	757	23.3
Majority		563	17.3
Turnout		3,254	48.1

St James Division
Party	Candidate	Votes	%
Labour	T. Wire	1,805	52.0
Conservative	A. Wright	1,157	33.4
Liberal Democrats	M. Minney	506	14.6
Majority		648	18.7
Turnout		3,468	54.2

Thorplands Division
Party	Candidate	Votes	%
Labour	L. Patterson	1,550	55.0
Conservative	J. Cartwright	858	30.5
Liberal Democrats	M. Taylor	408	14.5
Majority		692	24.6
Turnout		2,816	49.9

West Hunsbury Division
Party	Candidate	Votes	%
Conservative	C. Hugheston-Roberts	1,367	39.7
Liberal Democrats	J. Hope	1,044	30.3
Labour	U. Gravesande	886	25.7
UKIP	D. Clark	146	4.2
Majority		323	9.4
Turnout		3,443	62.0

Weston Division
Party	Candidate	Votes	%
Conservative	M. Hill	2,437	51.4
Labour	M. Cleaves	1,485	31.3
Liberal Democrats	J. Cramp	815	17.2
Majority		952	20.1
Turnout		4,737	68.9

=== South Northamptonshire District ===
Brackley East Division
Party	Candidate	Votes	%
Conservative	J. Shepherd-Cross	2,578	56.4
Labour	P. Sceeny	1,994	43.6
Majority		584	12.8
Turnout		4,572	61.0

Brackley West Division
Party	Candidate	Votes	%
Conservative	R. Sawbridge	2,056	50.4
Liberal Democrats	I. Franklin	1,094	26.8
Labour	G. Youens	931	22.8
Majority		962	23.6
Turnout		4,081	66.1

Bugbrooke Division
Party	Candidate	Votes	%
Conservative	J. Kirkbride	2,680	59.4
Labour	R. Johnson	944	20.9
Liberal Democrats	S. Pace	887	19.7
Majority		1,736	38.5
Turnout		4,511	70.8

Deanshanger Division
Party	Candidate	Votes	%
Conservative	A. Walker	2,526	57.2
Labour	V. Whitaker	1,892	42.8
Majority		634	14.4
Turnout		4,418	69.1

Greens Norton Division
Party	Candidate	Votes	%
Conservative	B. Smith	3,301	67.6
Labour	D. Wardle	1,582	32.4
Majority		1,719	35.2
Turnout		4,883	70.9

Hackleton Division
Party	Candidate	Votes	%
Conservative	B. Binley	2,811	61.0
Labour	R. Foot	1,171	25.4
Liberal Democrats	A. Simpson	627	13.6
Majority		1,640	35.6
Turnout		4,609	71.3

Middleton Cheney Division
Party	Candidate	Votes	%
Conservative	M. Mildren	2,771	57.5
Labour	C. Fitchett	2,046	42.5
Majority		725	15.1
Turnout		4,871	66.0

Roade Division
Party	Candidate	Votes	%
Conservative	D. Batten	2,075	51.7
Labour	W. Toone	1,245	31.0
Liberal Democrats	S. O'Connor	693	17.3
Majority		830	20.7
Turnout		4,043	70.2

Towcester Division
Party	Candidate	Votes	%
Conservative	R. Bromwich	2,018	49.4
Liberal Democrats	J. Calder	1,048	25.6
Labour	H. Kerr	1,022	25.0
Majority		970	23.7
Turnout		4,088	64.6

=== Wellingborough Borough ===
Croyland Division
Party	Candidate	Votes	%
Labour	A. Simon	2,282	50.5
Conservative	C. Benham	1,624	35.9
Liberal Democrats	P. Gaskell	613	13.6
Majority		658	14.6
Turnout		4,519	58.4

Earls Barton Division
Party	Candidate	Votes	%
Labour	G. Blackwell	2,900	56.0
Conservative	P. Bell	2,275	44.0
Majority		625	12.1
Turnout		5,175	72.6

Finedon Division
Party	Candidate	Votes	%
Conservative	J. Bailey	2,809	56.6
Labour	L. Warner	1,504	30.3
Liberal Democrats	W. Urmson	651	13.1
Majority		1,305	26.3
Turnout		4,964	71.4

Hemmingwell Division
Party	Candidate	Votes	%
Labour	J. Ashton	2,274	54.6
Conservative	Y. Miles	1,892	45.4
Majority		382	9.2
Turnout		4,166	64.1

Irchester Division
Party	Candidate	Votes	%
Labour	T. Maguire	1,989	44.6
Conservative	J. Saxby	1,922	43.1
Liberal Democrats	K. Clements	550	12.3
Majority		57	1.5
Turnout		4,461	71.2

Queensway Division
Party	Candidate	Votes	%
Labour	P. Jones	2,115	56.6
Conservative	V. Ager	1,230	32.9
Liberal Democrats	P. Thornborow	395	10.6
Majority		885	23.7
Turnout		3,740	58.3

c

Redwell Division
Party	Candidate	Votes	%
Conservative	M. Waters	2,036	48.5
Labour	J. Robinson	1,488	35.4
Liberal Democrats	P. Wilkins	674	16.1
Majority		548	13.1
Turnout		4,198	69.0

Swanspool Division
Party	Candidate	Votes	%
Labour	P. Cass	2,220	53.4
Conservative	J. Read	1,935	46.6
Majority		285	6.9
Turnout		4,155	64.8
