= 2009 Northamptonshire County Council election =

2009 UK local government election

| ← 2005 | 4 June 2009 | 2013 → |

All 73 seats in the Northamptonshire County Council 37 seats needed for a majority
| | First party | Second party |
|---|---|---|
| Party | Conservative | Liberal Democrats |
| Last election | 45 | 7 |
| Seats won | 56 | 9 |
| Seat change | ▲11 | ▲2 |
| Popular vote | 96,788 | 39,170 |
| Percentage | 51.3% | 20.8% |
| | Third party | Fourth party |
| Party | Labour | Independent |
| Last election | 21 |
| Seats before | | 0 |
| Seats won | 6 | 2 |
| Seat change | ▼15 | ▲2 |
| Popular vote | 36,685 | 4,159 |
| Percentage | 19.5% | 2.2% |
- Map showing the results of the 2009 Northamptonshire County Council elections.
Council control before election
Conservative
Council control after election
Conservative

Elections to Northamptonshire County Council took place on 4 June 2009, having been delayed from 7 May, in order to coincide with elections to the European Parliament. The Liberal Democrats replaced the Labour Party as the main opposition.

== Results summary ==
2009 Northamptonshire County Council election
| Party | Seats | Gains | Losses | Net gain/loss | Seats % | Votes % | Votes | +/− |
|---|---|---|---|---|---|---|---|---|
| Conservative | 56 | 12 | -1 | +11 | 76.7 | 51.3 | 96,788 | |
| Liberal Democrats | 9 | 4 | -2 | +2 | 12.3 | 20.8 | 39,170 | |
| Labour | 6 | 0 | -15 | -15 | 8.2 | 19.5 | 36,685 | |
| Green | 0 | 0 | 0 | 0 | 0.0 | 2.3 | 4,341 | |
| Independent | 2 | 2 | 0 | +2 | 2.7 | 2.2 | 4,159 | |
| BNP | 0 | 0 | 0 | 0 | 0.0 | 2.0 | 3,825 | |
| English Democrat | 0 | 0 | 0 | 0 | 0.0 | 0.9 | 1,746 | |
| Save Our Services | 0 | 0 | 0 | 0 | 0.0 | 0.8 | 1,446 | |
| CPA | 0 | 0 | 0 | 0 | 0.0 | 0.2 | 424 | |

== Division-by-Division results, by District ==
=== Corby Borough ===
Corby Central Division
| Party | Candidate | Votes | % |
|---|---|---|---|
| Labour | Mark Bullock (*) | 885 | 48.6 |
| Conservative | Lisa Jones | 353 | 19.4 |
| Liberal Democrats | Eddie McGeown | 327 | 18.0 |
| BNP | Roy Davies | 256 | 14.1 |
| Majority | | 532 | 29.2 |
| Turnout | | 1,821 | 29.7 |
| Labour hold | | | |

Corby Rural Division
| Party | Candidate | Votes | % |
|---|---|---|---|
| Conservative | Stan Heggs | 1,384 | 48.8 |
| Liberal Democrats | Phil Bromhall | 744 | 26.2 |
| Labour | Mary Butcher | 708 | 25 |
| Majority | | 640 | 22.6 |
| Turnout | | 2,836 | |
| Conservative hold | | | |

Danesholme Division
| Party | Candidate | Votes | % |
|---|---|---|---|
| Liberal Democrats | Chris Stanbra | 1,135 | 40 |
| Conservative | David John Sims | 1,007 | 34.8 |
| Labour | Jim McKellar | 732 | 25.3 |
| Majority | | 128 | 5.2 |
| Turnout | | 2,896 | 29.5 |
| Liberal Democrats hold | | | |

Kingswood Division
| Party | Candidate | Votes | % |
|---|---|---|---|
| Labour | John McGee | 938 | 46.9 |
| Conservative | Yvonne Elizabeth Alice Von Bujtar | 560 | 28 |
| Liberal Democrats | Barry O'Brian | 504 | 25.2 |
| Majority | | 378 | 18.9 |
| Turnout | | 2,002 | 31.67 |
| Labour hold | | | |

Lloyds Division
| Party | Candidate | Votes | % |
|---|---|---|---|
| Labour | Bob Scott | 982 | 44.9 |
| Conservative | Lynne Anne Wilson | 526 | 24.1 |
| BNP | Gordon Riddell | 363 | 16.6 |
| Liberal Democrats | Scott Ponton | 314 | 14.4 |
| Majority | | 456 | 20.8 |
| Turnout | | 2,185 | 32.67 |
| Labour hold | | | |

Shire Lodge Division
| Party | Candidate | Votes | % |
|---|---|---|---|
| Labour | Julie Brookfield | 904 | 40.1 |
| Conservative | Eve Howitt | 645 | 28.6 |
| BNP | Annette Carroll | 397 | 17.6 |
| Liberal Democrats | Terri Meechan | 308 | 13.7 |
| Majority | | 259 | 11.5 |
| Turnout | | 2,254 | 32.18 |
| Labour hold | | | |

=== Daventry District ===
Braunston Division
| Party | Candidate | Votes | % |
|---|---|---|---|
| Conservative | Robin Brown | 1,934 | 59.7 |
| Liberal Democrats | John Barry Lathan | 903 | 27.9 |
| Labour | Maureen Winifred Luke | 400 | 12.4 |
| Majority | | 1,031 | 31.8 |
| Turnout | | 3,237 | 40.84 |
| Conservative hold | | | |

Brixworth Division
| Party | Candidate | Votes | % |
|---|---|---|---|
| Conservative | Chris Millar | 2,344 | 72.3 |
| Liberal Democrats | Micheal Beardsworth | 612 | 18.9 |
| Labour | Paul Anthony Corazzo | 287 | 8.8 |
| Majority | | 1,732 | 53.4 |
| Turnout | | 3,243 | 42.18 |
| Conservative hold | | | |

Daventry East Division
| Party | Candidate | Votes | % |
|---|---|---|---|
| Conservative | Alan Hills | 1,393 | 61.7 |
| Liberal Democrats | Trinni Crake | 445 | 19.7 |
| Labour | Penny Price | 421 | 18.6 |
| Majority | | 948 | 42 |
| Turnout | | 2,259 | 29.9 |
| Conservative hold | | | |

Daventry West Division
| Party | Candidate | Votes | % |
|---|---|---|---|
| Conservative | Chris Long | 1,166 | 47.2 |
| BNP | David Jones | 451 | 18.3 |
| Labour | Betty Richards | 449 | 18.2 |
| Liberal Democrats | John Kenneth Crake | 405 | 16.4 |
| Majority | | 715 | 28.9 |
| Turnout | | 2,471 | 28.65 |
| Conservative hold | | | |

Long Buckby Division
| Party | Candidate | Votes | % |
|---|---|---|---|
| Conservative | Steve Osbourne | 1,743 | 62.7 |
| Liberal Democrats | Neil Arthur Crispin Farmer | 672 | 24.2 |
| Labour | Chris Meyers | 367 | 13.2 |
| Majority | | 1071 | 38.5 |
| Turnout | | 2,782 | 43.54 |
| Conservative hold | | | |

Moulton Division
| Party | Candidate | Votes | % |
|---|---|---|---|
| Conservative | Judy Shepard | 1,938 | 73.5 |
| Liberal Democrats | David Garlick | 697 | 26.5 |
| Majority | | 1241 | 47 |
| Turnout | | 2,635 | 41.46 |
| Conservative hold | | | |

Uplands Division
| Party | Candidate | Votes | % |
|---|---|---|---|
| Conservative | Catherine Broadman | 2,407 | 68.2 |
| Green | Kathy Wicksteed | 450 | 12.7 |
| Liberal Democrats | Ruth Williams | 363 | 10.3 |
| Labour | Sue Meyers | 311 | 8.8 |
| Majority | | 1,957 | 55.5 |
| Turnout | | 3,531 | 45.74 |
| Conservative hold | | | |

Weedon Bec & Woodford Division
| Party | Candidate | Votes | % |
|---|---|---|---|
| Conservative | Gina Ogden | 1,715 | 63.5 |
| Liberal Democrats | Christopher Robin Salaman | 672 | 24.9 |
| Labour | Bruce Armstrong Nichols | 314 | 11.6 |
| Majority | | 1,043 | 38.6 |
| Turnout | | 2,701 | 38.44 |
| Conservative hold | | | |

=== East Northamptonshire District ===
Higham Ferrers Division
| Party | Candidate | Votes | % |
|---|---|---|---|
| Conservative | Derek Lawson | 2,245 | |
| Labour | Alan Dunn | 690 | |
| Majority | | | |
| Turnout | | 2,935 | 36.37 |

Irthlingborough Division
| Party | Candidate | Votes | % |
|---|---|---|---|
| Conservative | Andrew Langley | 1,900 | |
| Labour | John Gray | 906 | |
| Majority | | | |
| Turnout | | 2,806 | 35.23 |

Oundle Division
| Party | Candidate | Votes | % |
|---|---|---|---|
| Conservative | Rupert Reichhold | 1,943 | |
| Liberal Democrats | Grant Bowles | 631 | |
| Labour | Paul King | 443 | |
| Majority | | | |
| Turnout | | 3,017 | 43.81 |

Prebebdal Division
| Party | Candidate | Votes | % |
|---|---|---|---|
| Conservative | Heather Smith | 2,062 | |
| Liberal Democrats | Ian Preston | 530 | |
| Labour | David Fisher | 307 | |
| Majority | | | |
| Turnout | | 2,899 | 47.59 |

Raunds Division
| Party | Candidate | Votes | % |
|---|---|---|---|
| Conservative | Dudley Hughes | 1,298 | |
| Green | Ryta Lyndley | 585 | |
| Labour | Neil Harvey | 452 | |
| Majority | | | |
| Turnout | | 2,335 | 35.54 |

Rushden East Division
| Party | Candidate | Votes | % |
|---|---|---|---|
| Conservative | Andrew Mercer | 1,358 | |
| Liberal Democrats | David Hooton | 581 | |
| Labour | Stephen Allen | 468 | |
| Majority | | | |
| Turnout | | 2,407 | 31.84 |

Rushden South Division
| Party | Candidate | Votes | % |
|---|---|---|---|
| Conservative | Michael Tye | 1,861 | |
| Liberal Democrats | James Wilson | 467 | |
| Labour | Christine Allen | 406 | |
| BNP | Wim Wauters | 317 | |
| Majority | | | |
| Turnout | | 3,051 | 37.94 |

Rushden West Division
| Party | Candidate | Votes | % |
|---|---|---|---|
| Conservative | Ronald Pinnock | 1,208 | |
| Labour | Robert Nightingale | 402 | |
| BNP | Derry Smith | 320 | |
| Liberal Democrats | Rachel Fearnley | 298 | |
| Majority | | | |
| Turnout | | 2,228 | 34.25 |

Thrapston Division
| Party | Candidate | Votes | % |
|---|---|---|---|
| Conservative | Bob Seery | 1,729 | |
| Liberal Democrats | Cerri Glynane | 613 | |
| Labour | Kevin McKeever | 398 | |
| Majority | | | |
| Turnout | | 2,740 | 36.97 |

=== Kettering Borough ===
Brambleside Division
| Party | Candidate | Votes | % |
|---|---|---|---|
| Conservative | Bill Parker | 1,204 | |
| Labour | Ellie Mans | 452 | |
| English Democrat | Derek Hilling | 420 | |
| Liberal Democrats | Alan Window | 219 | |
| Green | David Lane | 189 | |
| Majority | | | |
| Turnout | | 2,484 | 39.69 |

Burton Division
| Party | Candidate | Votes | % |
|---|---|---|---|
| Independent | Christopher Groome | 1,321 | |
| Conservative | Christopher Lamb | 958 | |
| Labour | Ronald Steele | 348 | |
| Majority | | | |
| Turnout | | 2,627 | 36.72 |

Desborough Division
| Party | Candidate | Votes | % |
|---|---|---|---|
| Conservative | Belinda Humfrey | 1,801 | |
| Labour | Mark Watson | 636 | |
| Liberal Democrats | Philip Rice | 581 | |
| Majority | | | |
| Turnout | | 3,018 | 39.38 |

Grange Division
| Party | Candidate | Votes | % |
|---|---|---|---|
| Conservative | Carolyn Maxted | 477 | |
| Labour | Eileen Hales | 463 | |
| Independent | Roy Mayhew | 459 | |
| BNP | Clive Skinner | 245 | |
| Liberal Democrats | Michael Quinn | 126 | |
| Majority | | | |
| Turnout | | 1,770 | 30.73 |

Ise Division
| Party | Candidate | Votes | % |
|---|---|---|---|
| Conservative | Bob Civil | 1,276 | |
| Liberal Democrats | Chris Nelson | 925 | |
| Labour | Adrian Perrin | 342 | |
| Majority | | | |
| Turnout | | 2,543 | 40.96 |

Kettering Central Division
| Party | Candidate | Votes | % |
|---|---|---|---|
| Conservative | Larry Henson | 1,276 | |
| Labour | Keli Watts | 958 | |
| Liberal Democrats | Jehad Soliman | 444 | |
| Majority | | | |
| Turnout | | | 35.71 |

Kettering Rural Division
| Party | Candidate | Votes | % |
|---|---|---|---|
| Conservative | Jim Harker | 2,625 | |
| Liberal Democrats | Stan Freeman | 798 | |
| Labour | Peter Weston | 546 | |
| Majority | | | |
| Turnout | | 3,969 | 45.4 |

Rothwell Division
| Party | Candidate | Votes | % |
|---|---|---|---|
| Conservative | Alan Clifford | 1,130 | |
| Labour | Alan Mills | 649 | |
| Independent | Kevin Sills | 259 | |
| Liberal Democrats | Daniel Garside | 231 | |
| Majority | | | |
| Turnout | | 2,269 | 38.39 |

St Andrew's and St Peter's Division
| Party | Candidate | Votes | % |
|---|---|---|---|
| Conservative | Matt Lynch | 1,360 | |
| Labour | Jonathan West | 655 | |
| Liberal Democrats | Cindy McGrath | 339 | |
| Green | Alan Heath | 314 | |
| Majority | | | |
| Turnout | | 2,668 | 35.09 |

Wickstead Division
| Party | Candidate | Votes | % |
|---|---|---|---|
| Conservative | Scott Edwards | 1,449 | |
| Liberal Democrats | Chris McGlynn | 664 | |
| Labour | Maggie Don | 608 | |
| Majority | | | |
| Turnout | | 2,721 | 37.82 |

=== Northampton Borough ===
Abington Division
| Party | Candidate | Votes | % |
|---|---|---|---|
| Conservative | Rebecca Harding | 624 | |
| Liberal Democrats | Brian Hoare | 615 | |
| Green | Jac Higgs | 440 | |
| Labour | Trevor Owen | 376 | |
| Majority | | | |
| Turnout | | 2,055 | 29.7 |

Billing Division
| Party | Candidate | Votes | % |
|---|---|---|---|
| Conservative | Christopher Malpas | 1,176 | |
| Labour | Trevor Bailey | 516 | |
| Liberal Democrats | Philip Buchan | 389 | |
| Majority | | | |
| Turnout | | 2,081 | 33.17 |

Boughton Green Division
| Party | Candidate | Votes | % |
|---|---|---|---|
| Conservative | Graham Lawman | 969 | |
| Liberal Democrats | John Yates | 878 | |
| Labour | Janet Phillips | 496 | |
| Majority | | | |
| Turnout | | 2,343 | 37.37 |

Castle Division
| Party | Candidate | Votes | % |
|---|---|---|---|
| Independent | Tony Clarke | 760 | |
| Labour | Tess Scott | 440 | |
| Conservative | Ian McCann | 361 | |
| Green | Julie Hawkins | 201 | |
| Liberal Democrats | Roger Conroy | 194 | |
| Majority | | | |
| Turnout | | 1,956 | 26.65 |

Delapre Division
| Party | Candidate | Votes | % |
|---|---|---|---|
| Liberal Democrats | Brendan Glynane | 662 | |
| Conservative | Mick Ford | 621 | |
| Labour | Kathy Smith | 372 | |
| BNP | Clive Lomax | 275 | |
| Save Our Services | Norman Adams | 219 | |
| Majority | | | |
| Turnout | | 2,149 | 30.03 |

East Hunsbury Division
| Party | Candidate | Votes | % |
|---|---|---|---|
| Conservative | Andre Gonzalez de Savage | 1,258 | |
| Liberal Democrats | Shaun Hope | 539 | |
| Labour | Robert Burnell | 351 | |
| Majority | | | |
| Turnout | | 2,148 | 32.7 |

Eastfield Division
| Party | Candidate | Votes | % |
|---|---|---|---|
| Conservative | Alan Wright | 832 | |
| Liberal Democrats | Jean Hawkins | 686 | |
| Labour | Steve O'Connor | 323 | |
| BNP | Jim Avery | 239 | |
| CPA | Colin Bricher | 112 | |
| English Democrat | Teresa Cannon | 110 | |
| Majority | | | |
| Turnout | | 2,302 | 34.99 |

Ecton Brook Division
| Party | Candidate | Votes | % |
|---|---|---|---|
| Conservative | David Mackintosh | 853 | |
| Labour | Keith Davies | 497 | |
| Liberal Democrats | Prince Chaudhury | 402 | |
| Majority | | | |
| Turnout | | 1,752 | 34.66 |

Headlands Division
| Party | Candidate | Votes | % |
|---|---|---|---|
| Liberal Democrats | Marion Minney | 904 | |
| Conservative | Brian Sargeant | 828 | |
| English Democrat | Sue Willis | 502 | |
| Labour | Nadim Choudary | 414 | |
| Majority | | | |
| Turnout | | 2,648 | 41.8 |

Kingsley Division
| Party | Candidate | Votes | % |
|---|---|---|---|
| Liberal Democrats | Richard Church | 709 | |
| Independent | Fitzy Fitzpatrick | 493 | |
| Labour | Catherine Russell | 463 | |
| Conservative | Gary Austin | 457 | |
| Green | Marcus Rock | 284 | |
| Majority | | | |
| Turnout | | 2,406 | 34.09 |

Kingsthorpe Division
| Party | Candidate | Votes | % |
|---|---|---|---|
| Liberal Democrats | Sally Beardsworth | 1,173 | |
| Conservative | Laura Hutchings | 633 | |
| BNP | Ray Beasley | 392 | |
| Labour | Chris Grethe | 328 | |
| Majority | | | |
| Turnout | | 2,526 | 37.83 |

Lumbertubs Division
| Party | Candidate | Votes | % |
|---|---|---|---|
| Liberal Democrats | Richard Giddings | 527 | |
| Labour | Ulric Gravesande | 524 | |
| Conservative | Lesley Callnon | 351 | |
| Save Our Services | Harry Tuttle | 277 | |
| Majority | | | |
| Turnout | | 1,679 | 29.19 |

Nene Valley Division
| Party | Candidate | Votes | % |
|---|---|---|---|
| Conservative | Phil Larratt | 1,943 | |
| Liberal Democrats | Laura Glynane | 773 | |
| Labour | Michael Vaughan | 409 | |
| Majority | | | |
| Turnout | | 3,125 | 36.32 |

New Duston Division
| Party | Candidate | Votes | % |
|---|---|---|---|
| Conservative | Matthew Goldby | 1,719 | |
| Labour | Geoff Howes | 375 | |
| Liberal Democrats | Suzanne Jwanczuk | 322 | |
| Majority | | | |
| Turnout | | 2,416 | 37.71 |

Old Duston Division
| Party | Candidate | Votes | % |
|---|---|---|---|
| Conservative | Don Edwards | 1,011 | |
| Save Our Services | Dave Green | 950 | |
| Labour | Janice Duffy | 351 | |
| Liberal Democrats | Daniel Jwanczuk | 89 | |
| Majority | | | |
| Turnout | | 2,401 | 38.4 |

Parklands Division
| Party | Candidate | Votes | % |
|---|---|---|---|
| Conservative | Mike Hallam | 1,390 | |
| Liberal Democrats | Portia Wilson | 962 | |
| Labour | Ifty Choudary | 303 | |
| CPA | Philip Bricher | 167 | |
| Majority | | | |
| Turnout | | 2,822 | 44.88 |

Spencer Division
| Party | Candidate | Votes | % |
|---|---|---|---|
| Liberal Democrats | Jenny Conroy | 793 | |
| Labour | Anjona Roy | 577 | |
| Conservative | Ivan Sljivic | 392 | |
| Majority | | | |
| Turnout | | 1,762 | 28.99 |

St Crispin Division
| Party | Candidate | Votes | % |
|---|---|---|---|
| Labour | Winston Strachan | 603 | |
| Independent | Russ Cooper | 494 | |
| Conservative | Penny Flavel | 460 | |
| Green | Hannah Gibson | 225 | |
| Liberal Democrats | Fern Conroy | 198 | |
| Majority | | | |
| Turnout | | 1,980 | 30.13 |

St David Division
| Party | Candidate | Votes | % |
|---|---|---|---|
| Liberal Democrats | Jane Hollis | 596 | |
| Conservative | Richard Cullis | 589 | |
| Labour | Ven Subbarayan | 572 | |
| Majority | | | |
| Turnout | | 1,757 | 26.98 |

St James Division
| Party | Candidate | Votes | % |
|---|---|---|---|
| Conservative | Suresh Patel | 943 | |
| Labour | Terry Wire | 724 | |
| Liberal Democrats | Pam Varnsverry | 507 | |
| Majority | | | |
| Turnout | | 2,174 | 32.43 |

Thorpelands Division
| Party | Candidate | Votes | % |
|---|---|---|---|
| Liberal Democrats | Dennis Meredith | 806 | |
| Conservative | Ray Kelly | 352 | |
| Labour | Joy Capstick | 307 | |
| Green | Mark Eales | 204 | |
| Majority | | | |
| Turnout | | 1,669 | 30.27 |

West Hunsbury Division
| Party | Candidate | Votes | % |
|---|---|---|---|
| Conservative | David Hugheston-Roberts | 1,642 | |
| Liberal Democrats | Paul Varnsverry | 1,031 | |
| Labour | Kathleen Franklin | 282 | |
| Majority | | | |
| Turnout | | 2,955 | 39.24 |

West Weston Division
| Party | Candidate | Votes | % |
|---|---|---|---|
| Conservative | Stephen Legg | 1,668 | |
| Liberal Democrats | Maureen Hill | 537 | |
| Green | Ellie Shelton | 401 | |
| Labour | Bob Purser | 368 | |
| Majority | | | |
| Turnout | | 2,974 | 43.82 |

=== South Northamptonshire District ===
Brackley East Division
| Party | Candidate | Votes | % |
|---|---|---|---|
| Conservative | Andrew Grant | 1,803 | |
| Liberal Democrats | Martin Johns | 811 | |
| Labour | Samuel Emerson | 297 | |
| Majority | | | |
| Turnout | | 2,911 | 36.31 |

Brackley West Division
| Party | Candidate | Votes | % |
|---|---|---|---|
| Conservative | Ron Sawbridge | 1,765 | |
| Liberal Democrats | Malcolm Mildren | 596 | |
| Labour | Gemma Maxwell-Evans | 246 | |
| Majority | | | |
| Turnout | | 2,607 | 41.23 |

Bugbrooke Division
| Party | Candidate | Votes | % |
|---|---|---|---|
| Conservative | Joan Kirkbride | 1,715 | |
| Liberal Democrats | Sue Pace | 665 | |
| Labour | Lynda Davies | 330 | |
| Majority | | | |
| Turnout | | 2,710 | 41.94 |

Deanshanger Division
| Party | Candidate | Votes | % |
|---|---|---|---|
| Conservative | Allan Walker | 1,918 | |
| Liberal Democrats | Hannah Saul | 755 | |
| Labour | Ann Macfarlane | 399 | |
| Majority | | | |
| Turnout | | 3,072 | 40.52 |

Greens Norton Division
| Party | Candidate | Votes | % |
|---|---|---|---|
| Conservative | Ben Smith | 2,268 | |
| Liberal Democrats | Christopher Lofts | 814 | |
| Labour | Wendy Randall | 253 | |
| Majority | | | |
| Turnout | | 3,335 | 46.79 |

Hackleton Division
| Party | Candidate | Votes | % |
|---|---|---|---|
| Conservative | Michael Clark | 2,127 | |
| Liberal Democrats | Marianne Taylor | 888 | |
| Majority | | | |
| Turnout | | 3,015 | 46.1 |

Middleton Cheney Division
| Party | Candidate | Votes | % |
|---|---|---|---|
| Conservative | Ken Melling | 1,875 | |
| Liberal Democrats | David Austin | 806 | |
| Labour | David James | 336 | |
| Majority | | | |
| Turnout | | 3,017 | 39.58 |

Roade Division
| Party | Candidate | Votes | % |
|---|---|---|---|
| Conservative | Bernard Ingram | 1,859 | |
| Liberal Democrats | Richard Matthews | 777 | |
| Independent | Mark James | 401 | |
| Labour | Thomas Clugston | 314 | |
| Majority | | | |
| Turnout | | 3,351 | 38.89 |

Towcester Division
| Party | Candidate | Votes | % |
|---|---|---|---|
| Conservative | Rosemary Bromwich | 1,648 | |
| Liberal Democrats | Scott Collins | 760 | |
| Labour | Giles Barringham | 293 | |
| Majority | | | |
| Turnout | | 2,701 | 37.27 |

=== Wellingborough Borough ===
Croyland Division
| Party | Candidate | Votes | % |
|---|---|---|---|
| Conservative | Jay Walia | 1,053 | |
| English Democrat | Terry Spencer | 714 | |
| Labour | Les Rolfe | 610 | |
| Liberal Democrats | Kevin Barron | 400 | |
| Majority | | | |
| Turnout | | 2,777 | 33.45 |

Earls Barton Division
| Party | Candidate | Votes | % |
|---|---|---|---|
| Labour | George Blackwell | 1,349 | |
| Liberal Democrats | Jane Brown | 1,346 | |
| Conservative | Brandon Eldred | 501 | |
| Majority | | | |
| Turnout | | 3,196 | 44.77 |

Finedon Division
| Party | Candidate | Votes | % |
|---|---|---|---|
| Conservative | John Bailey | 1,984 | |
| Liberal Democrats | Daniel Jones | 465 | |
| Green | Miriam Grzesiukowicz | 349 | |
| Labour | Ayo Ajanaku | 308 | |
| Majority | | | |
| Turnout | | 3,106 | 43.4 |

Hemmingwell Division
| Party | Candidate | Votes | % |
|---|---|---|---|
| Conservative | Bhupendra Patel | 1,366 | |
| Labour | Peter Wright | 680 | |
| Liberal Democrats | Irene Markham | 364 | |
| BNP | Simon Robinson | 296 | |
| Majority | | | |
| Turnout | | 2,706 | 36.81 |

Irchester Division
| Party | Candidate | Votes | % |
|---|---|---|---|
| Conservative | Sue Homer | 1,517 | |
| Labour | Tim McGuire | 1,353 | |
| Liberal Democrats | Charles Markham | 262 | |
| Majority | | | |
| Turnout | | 3,132 | 48.79 |

Queensway Division
| Party | Candidate | Votes | % |
|---|---|---|---|
| Conservative | David Dean | 872 | |
| Labour | Andrew Scarborough | 553 | |
| Green | Emma Hornett | 347 | |
| Liberal Democrats | Veronica Meredith | 271 | |
| Majority | | | |
| Turnout | | 2,043 | 33.34 |

Redwell Division
| Party | Candidate | Votes | % |
|---|---|---|---|
| Conservative | Malcolm Waters | 1,487 | |
| Labour | Adam Henley | 456 | |
| Liberal Democrats | Penny Wilkins | 394 | |
| Green | Shasha Khan | 146 | |
| Majority | | | |
| Turnout | | 2,483 | 41.87 |

Swanspool Division
| Party | Candidate | Votes | % |
|---|---|---|---|
| Conservative | Paul Bell | 958 | |
| Labour | Pat Cass | 543 | |
| Liberal Democrats | Julie White | 282 | |
| BNP | David Robinson | 274 | |
| Green | Jonathan Hornett | 270 | |
| Majority | | | |
| Turnout | | 2,327 | 36.11 |
