= Abington and Phippsville =

- ward West Northamptonshire Council
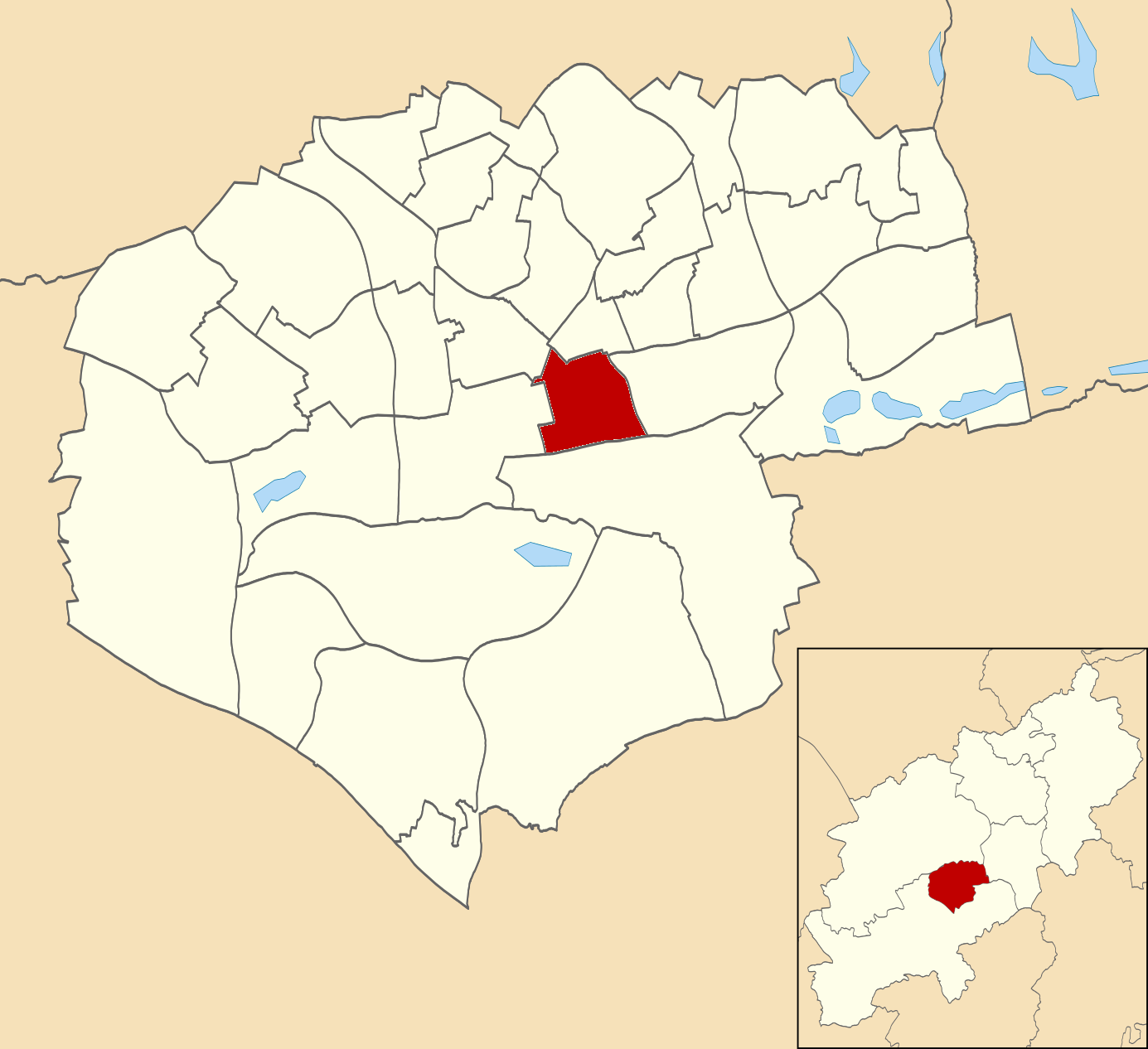
- Boundary of Abington and Phippsville in Northampton from 2013.
- Population: 13,599
- Electorate: 8,792
- Major settlements: Abington, Phippsville

Current ward
- Created: 2021
- Councillor: Zoe Smith (Labour)
- Councillor: Bob Purser (Labour)
- Number of councillors: 2

Abington and Phippsville is an electoral ward in Northampton, England. It is represented in Westminster by Lucy Rigby, the MP for Northampton North. The population of the ward was 13,599 at the 2021 census.

The ward was preceded mostly by the ward of Abington, which existed as a County Council ward until 2013, and as a Town Council ward until 2025.

== Councillors ==
=== Northampton Borough Council ===
Two councillors served the ward.

Abington ward, 1999–2021
Election	Councillor	Councillor
1999	Arthur McCutcheon (Lab)	Vivienne Dams (Lab)
2003	Irene Markham (Lib Dem)	Brian Hoare (Lib Dem)
2007	Irene Markham (Lib Dem)	Brian Hoare (Lib Dem)
2011	Tony Ansell (Conservative)	Iftikhar Choudary (Lab)
2015	Tony Ansell (Conservative)	Zoe Smith (Lab)
Council abolished

=== Northampton Town Council ===
Abington (TC) ward, 2021–2025
Election	Councillor	Councillor
2021	Bob Purser (Lab)	Walter-Wlodek Tarasiewicz (Lab)

Abington and Phippsville (TC) ward, 2025–present
Election	Councillor	Councillor
2025	Katie Evans (Lab)	Clive Millman (Lab)

=== Northamptonshire County Council ===
Abington ward, 2001–2013
Election	Councillor
2001	M. Boss (Lab)
2005	Brian Hoare (Lib Dem)
2009	Rebecca Harding (Lib Dem)

Abington and Phippsville ward, 2013–2017
Election	Councillor
2013	Danielle Stone (Lab)
2017	Danielle Stone (Lab)

=== West Northamptonshire Council ===
Abington and Phippsville, 2021–present
Election	Councillor	Councillor	Councillor
2021	Zoe Smith (Lab)	Bob Purser (Lab)	Walter-Wlodek Tarasiewicz (Lab)
2025	Zoe Smith (Lab)	Bob Purser (Lab)	Representation reduced to two members

== Elections in 2010s ==
=== May 2015 ===
2015
Party	Candidate	Votes	%	±%
Conservative	Tony Ansell	1,661		
Labour	Zoe Smith	1,567		
Labour	Jamal Alwahabi	1,366		
Conservative	Iftikhar Choudary	888		
Green	Drew Gray	719		
Liberal Democrats	Jill Panebianco	339		
Liberal Democrats	Regina Rogolska	185		
Turnout		4,286	58.86	
Conservative hold		Swing		
Labour hold		Swing		

=== May 2011 ===
2011
Party	Candidate	Votes	%	±%
Conservative	Anthony Ansell*	939		
Labour	Iftikhar Choudary*	752		
Conservative	William Grover	681		
Labour	Denise O'Hora	670		
Liberal Democrats	Brian Hoare	638		
Liberal Democrats	Irene Markham	609		
Green	Jacqueline Higgs	137		
Green	Maximilian Patzer	46		
Turnout		2,586	38.89	
Conservative gain from Liberal Democrats		Swing		
Labour gain from Liberal Democrats		Swing		

== Elections in 2000s ==
=== May 2007 ===
2007
Party	Candidate	Votes	%	±%
Liberal Democrats	Irene Markham	949		
Liberal Democrats	Brian Hoare	929		
Labour	Steve O'Connor	413		
Labour	Trevor Owen	372		
Conservative	Ray Kelly	364		
Conservative	Brian Sargeant	318		
Green	Jac Higgs	213		
Green	Marcus Rock	183		
Turnout		3,741		
Liberal Democrats hold		Swing		
Liberal Democrats hold		Swing		

=== May 2003 ===
2003
Party	Candidate	Votes	%	±%
Liberal Democrats	Irene Markham	986		
Liberal Democrats	Brian Hoare	893		
Labour	Trevor Owen	578		
Labour	Vivienne Dams	573		
Conservative	Juliette Ashby	446		
Conservative	Barry Stoker	414		
Turnout		3,890	31.6	

== Elections in 1990s ==
=== May 1999 ===
1999
Party	Candidate	Votes	%	±%
Labour	Arthur McCutcheon	884		
Labour	Vivienne Dams	870		
Conservative	Keith Cumberpatch	492		
Conservative	Robert Mackley	492		
Liberal Democrats	Irene Markham	322		
Liberal Democrats	Philip Oakman	255		
UKIP	Dusan Torbica	56		
Turnout		3,371	26.6	
