= Northampton Borough Council elections =

Local government elections in Northamptonshire, England

Northampton Borough Council was the local authority for Northampton in Northamptonshire, England and was elected every four years. From the last boundary changes in 1999, 47 councillors were elected from 23 wards. The borough council was abolished in 2021, with the area becoming part of West Northamptonshire.

== Political control ==
The results for each full council election from 1973 until the final election in 2015 were as follows:

Election	Party
1973	Labour
1976	Conservative
1979	Conservative
1983	No overall control Con largest single party
1987	Conservative
1991	No overall control
1995	Labour
1999	Labour
2003	No overall control Con largest single party
2007	Liberal Democrats
2011	Conservative
2015	Conservative

== Council elections ==
- 1973 Northampton Borough Council election
- 1976 Northampton Borough Council election
- 1979 Northampton Borough Council election (New ward boundaries)
- 1983 Northampton Borough Council election
- 1987 Northampton Borough Council election
- 1991 Northampton Borough Council election
- 1995 Northampton Borough Council election
- 1999 Northampton Borough Council election (New ward boundaries increased the number of seats by 4)
- 2003 Northampton Borough Council election
- 2007 Northampton Borough Council election
- 2011 Northampton Borough Council election (New ward boundaries)
- 2015 Northampton Borough Council election

== Borough result maps ==
1999 results map

2003 results map

2007 results map

2011 results map

2015 results map

== By-election results ==
=== 1995-1999 ===
Headlands By-Election 1 May 1997
Party	Candidate	Votes	%	±%
Liberal Democrats		1,435	38.5	−4.4
Labour		1,235	33.1	−2.2
Conservative		1,059	28.4	+6.6
Majority		200	5.4	
Turnout		3,729		
Liberal Democrats hold		Swing		

St Albans By-Election 1 May 1997
Party	Candidate	Votes	%	±%
Labour		1,867	58.6	−17.1
Conservative		841	26.4	+10.3
Liberal Democrats		407	12.8	+4.5
UKIP		71	2.2	+2.2
Majority		1,026	32.2	
Turnout		3,186		
Labour hold		Swing		

South By-Election 1 May 1997
Party	Candidate	Votes	%	±%
Labour		1,662	46.1	−16.4
Conservative		1,307	36.2	+9.3
Liberal Democrats		640	17.7	+7.0
Majority		355	9.9	
Turnout		3,609		
Labour hold		Swing		

St Crispin By-Election 11 June 1998
Party	Candidate	Votes	%	±%
Labour		551	65.9	−3.5
Liberal Democrats		113	13.5	−7.5
Conservative		96	11.5	+1.9
Green		45	5.4	+5.4
Independent		31	3.7	+3.7
Majority		438	52.4	
Turnout		836	16.7	
Labour hold		Swing		

=== 2003-2007 ===
Spencer By-Election 9 February 2006
Party	Candidate	Votes	%	±%
Liberal Democrats	Roger Conroy	635	42.2	+16.7
Labour	Alan Scott	546	36.3	−7.2
Conservative	Laura Norman	265	17.6	−13.4
Green	Marcus Rock	33	2.2	+2.2
CPA	Antony Solomon	25	1.7	+1.7
Majority		89	5.9	
Turnout		1,504	28.5	
Liberal Democrats gain from Labour		Swing		

=== 2007-2011 ===
New Duston By-Election 22 January 2009
Party	Candidate	Votes	%	±%
Conservative	Matthew Golby	1,072	53.0	+9.7
Labour	Geoff Howes	322	15.9	−1.3
Independent	David Huffadine-Smith	320	15.8	−3.8
Liberal Democrats	Marion Allen-Minney	307	15.2	+7.0
Majority		750	37.1	
Turnout		2,021	32.2	
Conservative hold		Swing		

=== 2015-2021 ===
Westone By-Election 21 July 2016
Party	Candidate	Votes	%	±%
Liberal Democrats	Brian Markham	583	49.7	+36.4
Conservative	Gregory Lunn	319	27.2	−28.7
Labour	Toby Birch	270	23.0	−7.6
Majority		264	23.4	
Turnout		1127	33	
Liberal Democrats gain from Conservative		Swing		

Eastfield By-Election 28 September 2017
Party	Candidate	Votes	%	±%
Labour	Paul Joyce	493	50.5	+13.5
Conservative	Pauline Woodhouse	288	29.5	−4.1
Liberal Democrats	Martin Sawyer	195	20.0	+16.7
Majority		205	20.9	
Turnout		980	27	
Labour hold		Swing		

Nene Valley By-Election 28 September 2017
Party	Candidate	Votes	%	±%
Conservative	Luke Graystone	803	52.5	+11.7
Labour	Nikesh Jani	343	22.4	+7.6
Liberal Democrats	Brian Hoare	293	19.2	+9.0
Green	Denise Donaldson	91	5.9	+5.9
Majority				
Turnout		1530	18.2	
Conservative hold		Swing		

Delapre and Briar Hill By-Election 29 November 2018
Party	Candidate	Votes	%	±%
Labour	Emma Roberts	914	43.4	+15.6
Conservative	Daniel Soan	549	26.0	+1.3
Independent	Nicola McKenna	417	19.8	+19.8
Liberal Democrats	Michael Maher	133	6.3	−10.4
Green	Denise Donaldson	95	4.5	+4.5
Majority		365	17.3	
Turnout		2,108		
Labour hold		Swing		
