= Simon Edens =

British police chief constable

Simon Edens QGM QPM

Chief Constable
- In office 27 July 2015 – 5 August 2018
- Monarch: Elizabeth II
- Home Secretary: Theresa May; Amber Rudd; Sajid Javid
- Commissioner: Adam Simmonds; Stephen Mold
- Preceded by: Adrian Lee
- Succeeded by: Nick Adderley

Deputy Chief Constable of Leicestershire Police
- In office 7 May 2012 – 26 July 2015
- Succeeded by: Roger Bannister

Personal details
- Born: Simon Edens Northern Ireland
- Spouse: Married

Simon Edens was a career police officer within the United Kingdom and is a former Chief Constable of Northamptonshire Police.

== Career history ==
Simon started his policing career with the Royal Ulster Constabulary (now the Police Service of Northern Ireland). Between 1981 and 1991, Simon served as a Constable and Sergeant in both urban and rural settings across Northern Ireland. In May 1989, Simon was awarded the Queen's Gallantry Medal for bravery in Northern Ireland.

In 1991, Simon joined Cambridgeshire Police in England as a Constable. Between 1991 and 2004, he was successfully promoted from Constable through to the rank of Chief Superintendent (circa 2004), having then taken command of Cambridgeshire Police’s Central Division and transformation across the Force later in 2006.

Given Simon’s leadership abilities, in 2007 he undertook the Strategic Command Course (designed for the promotion of Chief Officers) and in 2008 was hired by West Mercia Police as their Assistant Chief Constable – a position he held until 2012.

In August 2012, Simon was appointed Deputy Chief Constable of Leicestershire Police, assuming command and responsibilities for, among other things, performance, professional standards and corporate governance.

He was appointed Chief Constable of Northamptonshire Police by the then Police and Crime Commissioner of Northamptonshire, Adam Simmonds, in July 2015.

He retired from the police service on 5 August 2018.

== Honours and awards ==

- 1989: Queen's Gallantry Medal
- 2015: Queen's Police Medal
