= Nick Adderley =

English former police officer

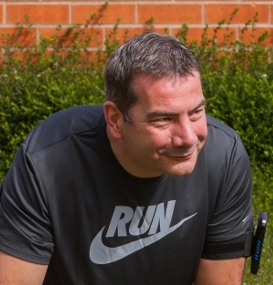
- Adderley in 2013

Chief Constable of Northamptonshire Police
- In office 6 August 2018 – 21 June 2024
- Home Secretary: Sajid Javid; Priti Patel; Suella Braverman; Grant Shapps; Suella Braverman; James Cleverly
- Commissioner: Danielle Stone
- Preceded by: Simon Edens
- Succeeded by: Ivan Balhatchet

Personal details
- Born: 1966 (age 59–60)
- Children: 2

Nicholas Adderley (born 1966) is an English former senior police officer who served as Chief Constable of Northamptonshire Police from 2018 to 2024. He was dismissed for gross misconduct, having embellished his military service in the Royal Navy and fabricated receiving both the General Service Medal (1962) and South Atlantic Medal.

== Early life ==
Adderley was born in 1966, and grew up in New Moston, Manchester, England. As a child, he was a member of the Sea Cadets, a youth organisation that is sponsored by the Ministry of Defence, from the age of ten. Adderley joined the Royal Navy in 1984 as a rating and left after serving for less than two years with the rank of able seaman.

He would later make the false claims that he had attended the Britannia Royal Naval College and served for 10 years in the Navy as an officer reaching the rank of lieutenant or commander.

== Police career ==
Adderley joined Cheshire Constabulary in 1992 at the age of 25 as a police constable.

He then took a break from the Police Service but has claimed to have worked in the public sector at the Home Office for 2 years at the Police Standards Unit, on secondment as a Chief Inspector. However, according to the response to a Freedom of Information Act request, Adderley worked for the Home Office from February to October 2006. Adderley was also reported serving as a Chief Inspector within Cheshire in August 2006.

He later transferred to the Greater Manchester Police (GMP), where he was promoted to Chief Superintendent in August 2011. In September 2013, he became the territorial commander of the North Manchester Division; keeping the same rank.

In 2015, he was promoted to assistant chief constable at Staffordshire Police after completing his Strategic Command Course.

=== Chief Constable ===
On 6 August 2018, Adderley became Chief Constable of Northamptonshire Police.

He was also the National Police Chiefs' Council (NPCC) national lead for disclosure and safeguarding as well as for motorcycling and criminal use of motorcycles.

In 2019 Adderley was involved in the investigation of the death of Harry Dunn in a motorcycle crash, where a suspect, the wife of a U.S. intelligence officer, claimed diplomatic immunity and left the United Kingdom. Adderley was criticised for tweeting "How sad but how predictable!!" about Dunn's parents' decision to sue the suspect in the U.S. civil courts. The parents called for his resignation, and referred Northamptonshire Police to the Independent Office for Police Conduct (IOPC). The Northamptonshire Police, Fire and Crime Commissioner Stephen Mold spoke to Adderley about the tweet and said that the force's communications should "remain professional and sensitive".

In April 2020, Adderley was rebuked by Home Secretary Priti Patel after controversial comments regarding his department's response to COVID-19 received wide media attention. He had stated at a press conference that while his police would not, "at this stage, start to marshal supermarkets and [check] the items in baskets and trolleys to see whether it's a legitimate necessary item", that if people did not heed his warnings, "we will start to do that". Patel declared that his comments had been "inappropriate". Adderley subsequently backed away from the threatened policing shift.

In February 2023 Adderley temporarily retired from Northamptonshire Police, due to return in April 2023. This was owing to pension arrangements for officers having reached 30 years' accumulated service negatively impacting the financial tenability of continuing in the role without that break. Adderley was suspended on 16 October 2023 as part of a gross misconduct investigation, overseen by the IOPC.

=== Misconduct, dismissal and criminal investigations ===
In 2023, Adderley came under investigation by the Independent Office of Police Conduct (IOPC) for misrepresenting his military service. When he was appointed chief constable of Northamptonshire Police he had claimed to have served in the navy for ten years; the BBC reported that he had in fact served for less than two years. He was also accused of wearing the South Atlantic Medal, a campaign for service in the Falklands War, despite having been 15 at the time, and of claiming to have held a rank which he did not in fact have. Adderley claimed that the medals had been given to him by his brothers to wear. In response to the complaint, he "immediately took advice last week regarding the protocol and have changed the side of [his] chest on which these medals are worn."

Adderley was suspended in October 2023. In April 2024 the IOPC announced that it had completed its investigation, had found that he might have committed a criminal offence, and was referring evidence to the Crown Prosecution Service. On 21 June 2024, the panel conducting the disciplinary hearing found Adderley guilty of gross misconduct. He was dismissed without notice and placed on the police barred list.

Adderley's fabricated military service and wearing of medals that he was not entitled to led to some calling him a "walt", a slang term for military impostors. Such "stolen valour" is not currently illegal in the United Kingdom, but the reaction to this case has led politicians from the Conservative Party and the Labour Party leader Sir Keir Starmer to call for a change in the law.

A second criminal investigation against Adderley began in March 2024 when Staffordshire Police served Adderley and another officer with papers alleging fraud in relation to the maintenance of police vehicles during the period when Adderley was the Assistant Chief Constable. The IOPC investigation into these allegations was completed in December 2024 and the IOPC found there was "no case to answer" by Adderley.

A report of June 2025, into Northamptonshire Police's handling of the death of Harry Dunn was critical of Adderley. On 19 June, Dunn's family submitted a formal complaint over Adderley's conduct for multiple failures, including giving inaccurate public statements about the legal immunity of Anne Sacoolas.

Adderley was formally charged for offences of fraud and misrepresentation in a public office on 21 October 2025. The charges relate to the allegations that he lied over his military service and his education. The first court hearing was held at Westminster Magistrates' Court on 10 November 2025. The case was deemed to be too serious for the Magistrates' court, and Adderley was told to appear at Southwark Crown Court on 8 December 2025. Adderley was granted unconditional bail.

At the hearing on 8 December 2025, a further charge of making a false witness statement was added to the indictment. This relates to an allegation that Adderley had, on 8 January 2020, given a witness statement in which he falsely claimed to have been a lieutenant commander in the Royal Navy.

In June 2026, it was reported that his next court hearing had been deferred to September 2027 due to a "medical delay".

== Honours ==

Ribbon	Description	Notes
	Queen Elizabeth II Golden Jubilee Medal	2002; UK version of this medal
	Queen Elizabeth II Diamond Jubilee Medal	2012; UK version of this medal
	Queen Elizabeth II Platinum Jubilee Medal	2022; UK version of this medal
	King Charles III Coronation Medal	2023; UK version of this medal
	Police Long Service and Good Conduct Medal	

Police appointments
Preceded by Simon Edens	Chief Constable of Northamptonshire Police; 2018–2024	Succeeded by Ivan Balhatchet
