= Ivan Balhatchet =

British police officer

Ivan Balhatchet is a senior British police officer. Balhatchet was appointed as interim Chief Constable of Northamptonshire Police in October 2023, following the suspension of his predecessor, Nick Adderley. In January 2025 it was confirmed that he was substantively appointed as Chief Constable. Balhatchet joined Northamptonshire Police in 2000, subsequently serving as a detective, a senior investigating officer, a strategic firearms commander and a hostage negotiator.

In November 2025, The Court of Appeal ruled that Northamptonshire Police had been "wilfully disobedient" because it had repeatedly failed to obey court rulings to hand over video footage to a complainant, Nadine Buzzard-Quahsie, who had been wrongfully arrested by three police officers in 2021. The Court also found Balhatchet, personally, to be in contempt of court. Noting that the law allowed him to be found personally liable for the disobedience, the Court observed that he could face up to two years in prison. This judgement was the first time in British history that a chief constable was found in contempt of court. A further court hearing on 20 November decided against imprisoning Balhatchet and instead imposed a fine of £50,000. Danielle Stone, Northamptonshire's Police, Fire and Crime Commissioner considered suspending Balhatchet but decided against it, noting that he had been unaware what had been going on until 22 October 2025. Balhatchet is believed to be the first Chief Constable to be found in contempt of court.
