= Police, Fire and Crime Commissioner for Northamptonshire (Fire and Rescue Authority) Order 2018 =

- Statutory Instrument
- Parliament of the United Kingdom
- Citation: SI 2018/1072
- Territorial extent: Northamptonshire

Dates
- Made: 10 October 2018
- Laid before Parliament: 12 October 2018
- Commencement: 1 January 2019

Status: Current legislation

Text of the Police, Fire and Crime Commissioner for Northamptonshire (Fire and Rescue Authority) Order 2018 as in force today (including any amendments) within the United Kingdom, from legislation.gov.uk.

The Police, Fire and Crime Commissioner for Northamptonshire (Fire and Rescue Authority) Order 2018 is a statutory instrument to transfer responsibility for the governance of the fire and rescue services in Northamptonshire from Northamptonshire County Council (NCC) to the Police and Crime Commissioner (PCC).

The proposal order was submitted by then Secretary of State, Sajid Javid in accordance with the Fire and Rescue Services Act 2004 which allows a proposal if it is in the interest of economy, efficiency, effectiveness and does not have an adverse effect on public safety.

The order came into force on 1 January 2019 and the Police and Crime Commissioner is now known as the Police, Fire and Crime Commissioner (PFCC).
