= Northamptonshire Police =

English territorial police force

- Common name: Northants Police
- Abbreviation: NorPol

Agency overview
- Formed: 1 April 1966; 60 years ago
- Preceding agencies: Northampton and County Constabulary (1966); Northamptonshire Constabulary (1840)
- Employees: 2,236
- Volunteers: 207
- Annual budget: £121 million (2014); £126 million (2018-19)

Jurisdictional structure
- Operations jurisdiction: Northamptonshire, UK
- Map of Northamptonshire Police's jurisdiction
- Area: 2,364 square kilometres (913 sq mi)
- Population: 723,000
- Governing body: Home Office
- General nature: Local civilian police

Operational structure
- Overseen by: His Majesty's Inspectorate of Constabulary and Fire & Rescue Services; Independent Office for Police Conduct
- Headquarters: Northampton
- Wootton Hall Park, Northampton NN4 0JQ
- Sworn Officers: 1,616
- Unsworn members: 929
- Elected officer responsible: Danielle Stone, Police, Fire and Crime Commissioner
- Agency executives: Ivan Balhatchet, Chief Constable; Ash Tuckley, Deputy Chief Constable; Paul Bullen, Assistant Chief Officer
- Child agencies: East Midlands Police Collaboration and Multi-Force Shared Services (MFSS); East Midlands Operational Support Service

Website
- www.northants.police.uk

Northamptonshire Police (colloquially known as Northants Police) is the territorial police force responsible for policing the county of Northamptonshire in the East Midlands of England, in the United Kingdom.

The Northamptonshire police area includes Brackley, Burton Latimer, Corby, Daventry, Desborough, Higham Ferrers, Irthlingborough, Kettering, Northampton, Oundle, Raunds, Rothwell, Rushden, Towcester, Thrapston and Wellingborough across 914 square miles (2,370 km^{2}) with a resident population of 710,000. It responds to more than one million phone calls a year, with more than 120,000 of these being emergency 999.

== History ==
Northamptonshire Police can trace its earliest roots to 1840, when the Northamptonshire Constabulary and Daventry Constabulary were formed. The establishment of police forces at that time was based upon principles established by Sir Robert Peel, the Home Secretary in 1822 and founder of modern-day policing in most Westminster-based systems of government. Known as the Peelian Principles, they describe a philosophy that define an ethical police force and include:

- Every police officer should be issued an identification number, to assure accountability for his actions.
- Whether the police are effective is not measured on the number of arrests, but on the lack of crime.
- Above all else, an effective authority figure knows trust and accountability are paramount. Hence, Peel's most often quoted principle that "The police are the public and the public are the police".

Upon creation, Northamptonshire Constabulary initially started with seven superintendents and 35 police constables, who worked in a primitive shift system and were paid 12 shillings a week.

In 1930, Northamptonshire Constabulary rolled-out their first motorised vehicles for law enforcement use. The inventory included two cars and four motorcycles for police officer use. The vehicles were stationed throughout the county, with one car based in Daventry and the other in Kettering. The motorcycles were stationed in Northampton, Wellingborough, Oundle and Towcester.

The Northamptonshire Constabulary merged with the borough police forces within Northamptonshire on 1 April 1966 to form Northampton and County Constabulary with an estimated 442 officers and actual strength of 387.

The force was renamed the Northamptonshire Police in 1975.

=== Chief constables ===
The chief constable is the most senior officer within Northamptonshire Police and holds command of the force. The chief constable is accountable to the police and crime commissioner, who appoints chief constables and may dismiss them.

Chief constables of Northamptonshire Police
Chief constable	Term	Comments
Henry Goddard	1840–1849	First chief constable
Henry Lambert Bailey	1849–1875	
Thomas Orde Hastings Lees	1875–1881	
James Kellie-MacCallum	1881–1931	Held the rank of lieutenant in the Army.
Angus Ferguson	1931–1941	
Robert Henry Dundas Bolton	1941–1960	Held the rank of captain in the Army.
John Aidan Hasting Gott	1960–1972	
Frederick Arthur Cutting	1972–1979	
Maurice Buck	1979–1986	
David O'Dowd	1986–1993	
Sir Edward Crew	1993–1996	
Sir Christopher Fox	1996–2003	
Peter Maddison	2003–2009	
Adrian Lee	2009–2015	
Simon Edens	2015–2018	
Nick Adderley	2018–2024	Held the rank of able seaman in the Navy. Dismissed for gross misconduct after being found guilty of exaggerating his military career.
Ivan Balhatchet	2023–present	

== Northamptonshire Police and Crime Commissioner ==
The Northamptonshire Police and Crime Commissioner (PCC) is an elected official charged with securing efficient and effective policing within the county. The position replaces the now abolished police authorities. The PCC is elected for four-year terms. The first incumbents were elected on 15 November 2012.

The current PCC is Danielle Stone who was elected to office on 9 May 2024 to a term expiring in May 2028.

The core functions of the PCC is to secure the maintenance of an efficient and effective police force within Northamptonshire, and to hold the Chief Constable to account for the delivery of the police and crime plan. The PCC is also charged with holding the police fund (from which all policing in the county is financed) and raising the local policing precept from council tax. Lastly, the PCC is responsible for the appointment, suspension and dismissal of the Chief Constable.

=== Police and Crime Plan ===
Shortly after their election to office, the PCC is required to produce a Police and Crime Plan. The plan must include their objectives for policing, what resources will be provided to the Chief Constable and how performance will be measured. Both the PCC and the Chief Constable must have regard to the Police and Crime Plan in the exercise of their duties. The PCC is required to produce an annual report to the public on progress in policing. The Police and Crime Plan 2014-2017 is Northamptonshire Police's foundation document.

=== Police funding ===
The PCC is charged with managing the 'police fund', from which all policing is financed. The bulk of funding for the police fund comes from the Home Office in the form of an annual grant (calculated on a proportionate basis by the Home Office to take into account the differences between the 43 forces in England and Wales, which vary significantly in terms of population, geographical size, crime levels and trends), though the PCC has the authority to set a precept on the Council Tax to raise additional funds. The PCC is responsible for setting the budget for the Force, which includes allocating enough money from the overall policing budget to ensure that they can discharge their own functions effectively.

== Facilities ==
Police officers and staff operate from the Police Force Headquarters at Wootton Hall in Northampton as well an additional six smaller stations based in: Corby, Daventry, Kettering, Northampton, Wellingborough and Weston Favell. The police also operate from a shared base with the fire service in Rushden, based out of the fire station there.

There are also two Justice Centres:

- Criminal Justice Centre (Brackmills) - This is a base for police support staff, officers and also has a custody centre.
- Weekley Wood Justice Centre (Kettering) - This is a base for police support staff, officer and also has a custody centre.
  - Weekley Wood is also a joint base for administrative staff of the Northamptonshire Fire and Rescue Service.

== Organisation ==
The force is led by the chief constable, and is composed of:

- The chief officers and Force Command Team;
- Crime and Justice Command;
- Force Support Departments;
- East Midlands Police Collaboration; and,
- Multi-Force Shared Services.

== PEEL inspection ==
His Majesty's Inspectorate of Constabulary and Fire & Rescue Services (HMICFRS) conducts a periodic police effectiveness, efficiency and legitimacy (PEEL) inspection of each police service's performance. In its latest PEEL inspection, Northamptonshire Police was rated as follows:

	Outstanding	Good	Adequate	Requires Improvement	Inadequate
2021 rating			Preventing Crime; Investigating Crime; Supporting Victims; Disrupting serious organised crime	Treatment of the public; Responding to the public; Protecting vulnerable people; Managing offenders; Developing a positive workplace; Good use of resources	

== Resources ==
=== Vehicles ===
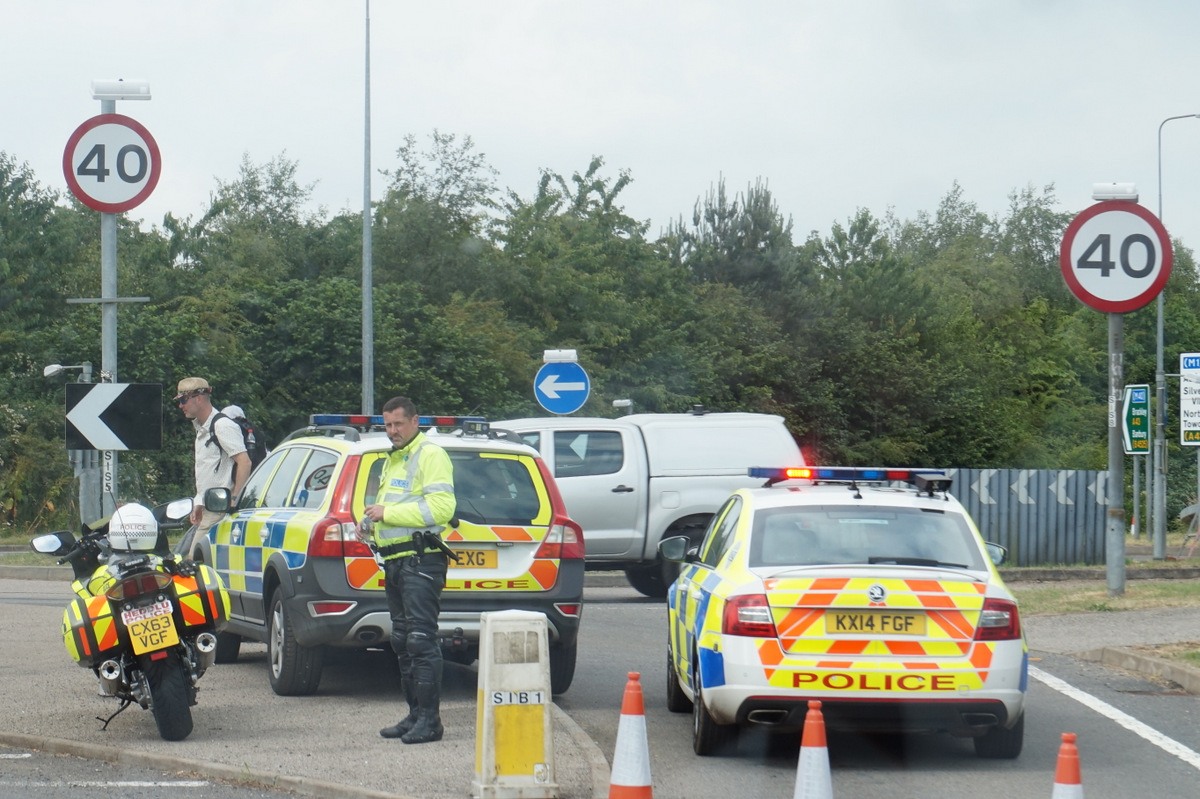
Northamptonshire Police vehicles on patrol in 2015

As of January 2016, Northamptonshire Police use a range of vehicles to perform their duties. Vehicles are used for regular patrols and response, armed response, road crime units, and dog units. They also use motorcycles.

=== Air support ===
Northamptonshire Police do not have their own aircraft as all English and Welsh police forces are now supported by the centralised National Police Air Service.

=== East Midlands Operational Support Service (EMOpSS) ===
Northamptonshire was formerly a member of the shared service that works to collaborate and share officers, resources and equipment between Lincolnshire Police and Leicestershire Police.

=== Computing equipment ===
In 2011, Northamptonshire Police was one of the police forces critical of the costs of using a procurement framework agreement, Sprint ii, to purchase IT supplies from a sole supplier. Sprint ii was set up by the government's Crown Commercial Service in 2010 and mandated for police authority use from March 2011, but concerns were raised that costs were higher than they would be using other collaborative purchasing channels. The mandate expired at the end of the life of the framework agreement.

=== Tasers ===
On 19 August 2019, then chief constable Nick Adderley announced that he would be equipping all front line officers with tasers, after a Police Federation of England and Wales poll found that 94% of officers would like to see more officers armed with tasers. Adderley stated that the deployment would take approximately 18 months and cost the force around £220,000, but he felt that it was justifiable, given the increase in violent attacks against officers.

== See also ==
- List of law enforcement agencies in the United Kingdom, Crown Dependencies and British Overseas Territories
- Law enforcement in the United Kingdom
