= Nadine Buzzard-Quashie case =

English court case

Nadine Buzzard-Quashie is a British woman who won a case in 2025 against Northamptonshire Police over access to body-worn video footage of her. She was arrested by Northamptonshire Police in September 2021. Northamptonshire Police failed to hand over the body-worn video of the arrest to the courts, for which they were fined. An Independent Office for Police Conduct (IOPC) investigation into the events is ongoing.

== Events ==
Buzzard-Quashie was arrested at home in London on 13 March 2021 on suspicion of sending malicious communications. She had posted to Instagram examples of racist messages she had received. She was held in custody at Hammersmith police station for 17 hours. The case was subsequently dropped. Buzzard-Quashie requested the CCTV of her detention, which she received on 24 August 2021. This showed that the police had retained footage of her using the toilet in her cell, with her genitals exposed.

Disturbed by events, Buzzard-Quashie left home on 2 September. Her mother reported her missing. On 3 September 2021, Buzzard-Quahsie was arrested by Northamptonshire Police. She was wrestled to the ground. She alleged this was a wrongful arrest involving excessive force. She described the arrest as "degrading" and says her face was pushed into a patch of stinging nettles. She was charged, but the case dropped. She was taken to a police station and her belongings removed. When they were returned, she has said the CCTV footage she had been carrying with her was missing, but Northamptonshire Police say all her possessions were returned to her.

On 6 September, Buzzard-Quahsie requested the body-worn camera footage of her arrest, but this was not supplied. She made a data protection complaint to the Information Commissioner's Office. On 1 April 2022, the Information Commissioner, having found in her favour, instructed the police to release the footage. Buzzard-Quahsie received some material, but believing it not to be complete, she issued a claim accusing the Chief Constable of Northamptonshite Police, Ivan Balhatchet, of breaching the Data Protection Act 2018. On 25 April 2023, a court ordered the Chief Constable to release all the footage, but he did not. Buzzard-Quahsie issued an application for contempt of court on 2 June.

On 15 March 2024, lawyers for the police said all footage had been released to Buzzard-Quahsie or was unavailable as it had been deleted. However, in summer 2025, her lawyers found audit logs showing this not to be the case. On 21 October 2025, the Chief Constable said failures had been made and admitted to contempt of court. He was personally fined £50,000.

An Independent Office for Police Conduct (IOPC) investigation has been launched, with a senior police officer and two police staff members under criminal investigation for allegedly perverting the course of justice.
