= Angus Ferguson =

Chief Constable Angus Arthur Ferguson
- Born: 26 July 1903 (age 123)
- Occupation: Chief Constable
- Employer: Northamptonshire Constabulary
- Predecessor: James Dalgleish Kellie-McCallum
- Successor: Bertie Bolton

Angus Arthur Ferguson, formerly a detective with the Edinburgh City Police, was chief constable of Northamptonshire Constabulary from 1931 until 1941. His father was a British Army officer and police officer, who served as His Majesty's Inspector of Constabulary in Scotland from 1904 to 1927.

Police appointments
Preceded by James Dalgleish Kellie-McCallum	Chief Constable of Northamptonshire Constabulary; 2011 - present	Succeeded by Bertie Bolton
