= East Midlands Operational Support Service =

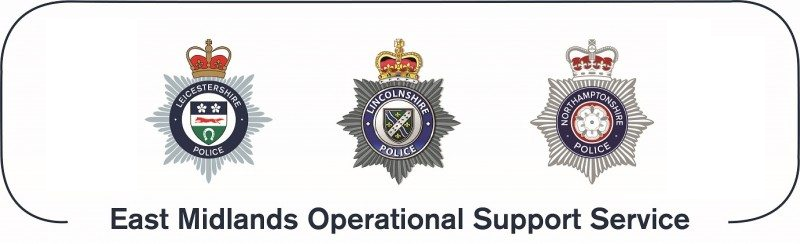
- Abbreviation: EMOpSS

Agency overview
- Formed: 5 May 2015
- Annual budget: ~£22,000,000 GBP (2015)
- Legal personality: Law enforcement agency partnership

Jurisdictional structure
- Operations jurisdiction: Leicestershire, UK; Lincolnshire, UK
- Constituting instrument: Police Act 1996
- General nature: Local civilian police

Operational structure
- Elected officers responsible: Willy Bach, Baron Bach, Leicestershire Police and Crime Commissioner; Marc Jones, Lincolnshire Police and Crime Commissioner
- Agency executive: Julia Debenham, Assistant Chief Constable of Leicestershire Police
- Parent agency: Leicestershire Police; Lincolnshire Police

The East Midlands Operational Support Service (EMOpSS) is a multi-force shared service, incorporating two UK Police Forces within the East Midlands region of the United Kingdom.

== History ==
The East Midlands Operational Support Service (EMOpSS) was established on 5 May 2015 under a collaboration agreement in accordance with Section 23E of the Police Act 1996. The parties affected by this agreement are police and crime commissioners for Leicestershire, Lincolnshire, Northamptonshire, and Nottinghamshire, as well as the chief constables for all of the four forces.

=== Nottinghamshire Police Internal Review ===
On 1 May 2018 the Nottinghamshire Police left the East Midlands Operational Support Service after an internal review found that the service was "fundamentally flawed," "inefficient," and "unsustainable."

Nottinghamshire Police also stated that their response times had been greatly delayed due to the shared service and that some police cars had been seriously damaged due to extended and prolonged use, travelling hundreds of miles a day.

Paddy Tipping, Nottinghamshire Police and Crime Commissioner, said at the time that he was not confident that people in need of help would get it in a timely manner due to the EMOpSS.

The remaining three forces in the shared service stated that they did not agree with Nottinghamshire Police's review and said that although the service may have not worked well in Nottinghamshire, it was working fine in the remaining forces.

=== Northamptonshire Police Leaving the Partnership ===
On 30 March 2019, Northamptonshire Police formally left the partnership. In May 2021 the Chief Constable Nick Adderley stated that Northamptonshire Police were now "reaping the benefits of bringing specialist operational units back to Northamptonshire". The Chief Constable also stated that his primary responsibility is Northamptonshire and the people of Northamptonshire were not benefiting from this partnership. This appears to be the same conclusion that Nottinghamshire Police came to just one year prior. Northamptonshire Police recorded a 122% increase in incidents that armed officers responded to and now have 15 of their own police dogs.

== Organization ==
The East Midlands Operational Support Service is the responsibility of the police and crime commissioners for the partner forces, as well as their chief constables. The EMOpSS combines the specialist officers and resources of Leicestershire Police, Lincolnshire Police and Northamptonshire Police. These specialist officers and resources work together to support the three counties and form six primary units/teams.

Although the chief constables and commissioners are responsible for the support service, the forces decided to allow the assistant chief constable of Leicestershire Police, Julia Debenham, to be directly in charge of EMOpSS.

=== Dog Section ===
The EMOpSS Dog Section provides the region with 40 general-purpose police dogs that are deployed for a variety of operations, including searching for people, evidence, illegal substances, disarming violent offenders, and compliance.

The Dog Section is based out of Leicestershire Police Headquarters in Leicester.

=== Roads and Armed Policing Team (RAPT) ===
The EMOSS Roads and Armed Policing Team (RAPT) are a 24/7 response and patrol team. Each officer in RAPT is a Home Office approved authorized firearm officer and has advanced driving and pursuit training. RAPT officers are equipped with firearms and tasers. RAPT are responsible for patrolling roads, combatting anti-social or illegal driving, counter-terrorism, and attacks involving weapons.

=== Serious Collision Investigation Unit (SCIU) ===
The role of the SCIU is to investigate all fatal road collisions, where someone is seriously injured, and those where someone is believed to be at fault. They also support families of people who have been fatally wounded in a road traffic collision.

The Serious Collision Investigation Unit is made up of five separate and specific roles.:

- Senior Investigating Officer (SIO) - Usually a sergeant or inspector who is responsible for the deployment of SCIU and each investigation.
- Forensic Collision Investigator (FCI) - Responsible for assembling evidence and reconstructing collisions to deem if driver error was responsible.
- Forensic Vehicle Investigator (FVI) - Responsible for gathering evidence and inspecting vehicles to see if there were faults with a vehicle involved.
- Investigation Officers (IO's) - Responsible for collecting evidence, statements, and interviewing witnesses and suspects.
- Family Liaison Officer (FLO) - Responsible for informing the family of someone who has been fatally or critically wounded and supporting them throughout the investigation.

=== Tactical Armed Policing Team ===
Officers within the Tactical Armed Policing Team are Home Office Approved Authorised Firearms Officers. They are responsible for: responding to armed incidents, pre-planned armed deployments (such as search/arrest warrants where the suspect is believed to be armed), prisoner escorts and responding to CBRN incidents.

The Tactical Armed Policing Team are based out of Northamptonshire Police Headquarters in Northampton.

=== Tactical Roads Policing Team (TRPT) ===
The Tactical Roads Policing Team of EMOpSS is responsible for patrolling roads and enforcing road traffic laws, combating Anti-social behaviour driving, vehicle pursuits and discouraging criminal behaviour by remaining visible to the public.

The TRPT is based out of a Lincolnshire Police station in Grantham and Leicestershire Police Headquarters.

=== Tactical Support Team ===
The Tactical Support Team are a group of officers who are responsible for executing search warrants, public order and specialist searches for evidence, missing people or bodies. They specialize in the method of entry, underwater searching and water rescue.
