= James Kellie-MacCallum =

British police officer

James Kellie-MacCallum CBE KPM

Chief Constable of Northamptonshire Constabulary
- In office 1881–1931

Personal details
- Born: James Dalgleish Kellie-MacCallum; 1845 Braco Castle, Braco, Perthshire, Scotland
- Died: 7 September 1932 (aged 86–87)

James Dalgleish Kellie-MacCallum (1845 – 7 September 1932) was a British police officer who served as Chief Constable of Northamptonshire County Constabulary for fifty years, from 1881 to 1931.

Kellie-MacCallum was born at Braco Castle, Perthshire and educated at Loretto School and Trinity College, Glenalmond. He was commissioned into the 79th Foot (later the Cameron Highlanders) in 1865. He served in the Ashanti War of 1873–1874, attached to the Black Watch, and was recommended for the Victoria Cross during the advance on Kumasi. He did not receive it, but was mentioned in despatches. He later served as the Adjutant of the 79th Foot until July 1876. Shortly afterward, in September 1876, he retired from the Army with the rank of lieutenant.

He was awarded the King's Police Medal (KPM) in December 1912, appointed Officer of the Order of the British Empire (OBE) in the 1920 civilian war honours, and Commander of the Order of the British Empire (CBE) in the 1924 Birthday Honours.

== Footnotes ==
Police appointments
Preceded by Unknown	Chief Constable of Northamptonshire; 1881–1931	Succeeded by Angus Arthur Ferguson
