= Bertie Bolton =

English cricketer (1893–1964)

Personal information
- Full name: Robert Henry Dundas Bolton
- Born: 13 January 1893; Mysore, Kingdom of Mysore, British India
- Died: 30 October 1964 (aged 71); St Pancras, London, England
- Batting: Right-handed

Domestic team information
- Years: Team
- 1910–1912: Dorset
- 1913–1922: Hampshire

Career statistics
Competition	First-class
Matches	7
Runs scored	121
Batting average	10.08
100s/50s	–/–
Top score	24
Catches/stumpings	2/–
- Source: ESPNcricinfo, 1 January 2010

Robert Henry Dundas Bolton (13 January 1893 – 30 October 1964) was an English first-class cricketer, soldier, police officer and chief constable of Northamptonshire Constabulary.

== Life ==
The son of Edward Crawford Bolton, he was born in British India at Mysore in January 1893. He was educated at Rossall School, where he played for the school cricket team. Bolton played minor counties cricket for Dorset from 1910 to 1912, making sixteen appearances in the Minor Counties Championship. In 1913, he made two appearances in first-class cricket for Hampshire against Cambridge University and Warwickshire, the latter in the County Championship. Four months into the First World War, he was commissioned into the British Indian Army Reserve as a second lieutenant in November 1914. He served in the East African campaign with the 101st Grenadiers from 27 November 1914 to 3 September 1916, and was promoted to lieutenant in November 1915. The regiment was transferred to Palestine and here he saw service from 4 September 1916 to 31 October 1918. He was transferred to the 2nd battalion 101st Grenadiers on its formation at Suez on 3 February 1917. On 4 June 1917 he was appointed to the Indian Army as a lieutenant with seniority from 13 August 1916. Following the war, he was made acting captain between 6 February and 8 December 1919, before being promoted to captain in August 1919. He saw service in Waziristan between 1919 and 1921.

Following his service in Waziristan, he returned to England in the summer of 1921. He resumed playing first-class cricket for Hampshire, making two appearances in the 1921 County Championship against Nottinghamshire and Leicestershire. The following season, he made a further three first-class appearances in the County Championship. For Hampshire, he made seven first-class appearances. In these, he scored 121 runs at an average of 10.08, with a highest score of 24. On 18 November 1921, he transferred to the Duke of Wellington's Regiment of the British Army. He retired from military service in November 1933, retaining the rank of captain. Bolton then joined the Metropolitan Police and in 1941, he became chief constable of Northamptonshire Constabulary. He would hold this post until 1960. He was made an OBE in the 1952 New Year Honours. During his time with Northamptonshire Constabulary, he also acted as a team selector for Northamptonshire County Cricket Club. Bolton died in St Pancras in October 1964.
