= 2011 Northampton Borough Council election =

2011 UK local government election

← 2007	5 May 2011	2015 →

All 45 seats in the Northampton Borough Council 23 seats needed for a majority
	First party	Second party	Third party
Party	Conservative	Labour	Liberal Democrats
Last election	15	5	26
Seats won	26	15	4
Seat change	▲11	▲10	▼22
Popular vote	36,122	18,807	21,235
Percentage	42.7%	22.3%	25.1%
- Map showing the results of the 2011 Northampton Borough Council elections.
Council control before election
Liberal Democrats
Council control after election
Conservative

Elections to Northampton Borough Council were held on 5 May 2011. The whole council was up for election and the Liberal Democrats Lost overall control of the council to the Conservative Party. There was no general election taking place at the same time.

== Election result ==
There were significant changes to the borough council in 2011 compared to the 2007 Borough election so that it is not possible to record all gains and losses. There were 45 seats in 2011 compared to 47 in 2007 with many changes to individual seats.

Northampton local election result 2011
Party	Seats	Gains	Losses	Net gain/loss	Seats %	Votes %	Votes	+/−
Conservative	26				57.8	42.7	36,122	+16.3
Labour	15				33.3	22.3	18,807	-3.4
Liberal Democrats	4				8.9	25.1	21,235	-44.7
UKIP	0				0.0	1.3	1,125	
Independent	0				0.0	6.4	5,423	
Green	0				0.0	1.6	1,333	
BNP	0				0.0	0.6	471	

== Ward results ==
The number in brackets after the ward name is the number of councillors to be elected. An asterisk after the name (*) indicate the candidate was elected. Candidates are listed in order of number of votes. 'Turnout' indicates the number of ballot papers issued followed by the percentage of registered voters voting. Votes could be cast for 1 up to 3 candidates in some cases, though voting for more than the specified number would disqualify the ballot paper. Several wards were changed in 2011 from those in 2007 – it is therefore not possible to indicate all gains and holds in some cases.

Abington (2)
Party	Candidate	Votes	%	±%
Conservative	Anthony Ansell	939		
Labour	Iftikhar Choudary	752		
Conservative	William Grover	681		
Labour	Denise O'Hora	670		
Liberal Democrats	Brian Hoare	638		
Liberal Democrats	Irene Markham	609		
Green	Jacqueline Higgs	137		
Green	Maximilian Patzer	46		
Turnout		2,586	38.89	
Conservative gain from Liberal Democrats		Swing		
Labour gain from Liberal Democrats		Swing		

Billing (2)
Party	Candidate	Votes	%	±%
Conservative	David Palethorpe	1,284		
Conservative	Christopher Malpas	1,173		
Labour	Trevor Bailey	866		
Labour	Danny Beales	776		
Liberal Democrats	Norma Felstead	353		
Liberal Democrats	Farhana Khan	208		
Turnout		2,529	40.20	
Conservative hold		Swing		
Conservative hold		Swing		

Boothville (1)
Party	Candidate	Votes	%	±%
Conservative	Jamie Lane	918		
Liberal Democrats	Portia Wilson	584		
Turnout		1,584	46.96	
Conservative hold		Swing		

Brookside (1)
Party	Candidate	Votes	%	±%
Labour	Lee Mason	607		
Liberal Democrats	Michael Fuller	287		
Conservative	Richard Booker	261		
Independent	Edward McNabb	157		
Turnout		1,328	35.71	
Labour hold		Swing		

Castle (3)
Party	Candidate	Votes	%	±%
Labour	Azizur Mohammed	1,068		
Labour	Winston Strachan	1,042		
Labour	Danielle Stone	1,023		
Independent	Anthony Clarke	741		
Liberal Democrats	Jane Hollis	464		
Conservative	Colin Bagnall	457		
Green	Julie Hawkins	443		
Conservative	Alistair Mackenzie	438		
Liberal Democrats	Rachel Fearnley	426		
Liberal Democrats	Jacqueline Glynane	414		
Conservative	Anne Walton	391		
Independent	Malcolm Mildren	342		
Turnout		2,780	28.79	
Labour hold		Swing		
Labour gain from Independent		Swing		

Delapre & Briar Hill (3)
Party	Candidate	Votes	%	±%
Labour	Marie Davies	969		
Liberal Democrats	Brendan Glynane	947		
Conservative	Michael Ford	911		
Conservative	Kevin Reeve	846		
Labour	John Rawlings	820		
Liberal Democrats	Pamela Varnsverry	804		
Liberal Democrats	Paul Varnsverry	771		
Conservative	James Petter	744		
Labour	James Thurston	740		
Independent	Graham Walker	568		
BNP	Mark Plowman	274		
Independent	Norman Adams	258		
Green	Christiane Nunez	250		
Turnout		3,422	33.59	
Labour hold		Swing		
Conservative gain from Liberal Democrats		Swing		

Eastfield (1)
Party	Candidate	Votes	%	±%
Labour	Elizabeth Gowen	531		
Conservative	Jean Hawkins	445		
Liberal Democrats	James Wilson	269		
Green	Anthony Lochmuller	81		
CPA	Colin Bricher	47		
Turnout		1,388	38.77	
Labour hold		Swing		

East Hunsbury (2)
Party	Candidate	Votes	%	±%
Conservative	Brandon Eldred	2,045		
Conservative	Philip Larratt	1,736		
Liberal Democrats	John Price	862		
Liberal Democrats	Jill Panebianco	669		
Turnout		3,113	39.17	
Conservative hold		Swing		
Conservative hold		Swing		

Headlands (1)
Party	Candidate	Votes	%	±%
Labour	Sivaramen Subbarayan	494		
Conservative	Paul Rolfe	489		
Liberal Democrats	Naz Islam	355		
Turnout		1,354	37.07	
Labour gain from Liberal Democrats		Swing		

Kings Heath (1)
Party	Candidate	Votes	%	±%
Liberal Democrats	Roger Conroy	476		
Labour	Stephen O'Connor	352		
Conservative	Anthony Andreoli	173		
Turnout		1,007	30.38	
Liberal Democrats hold		Swing		

Kingsley (1)
Party	Candidate	Votes	%	±%
Labour	Beverley-Anne Mennel	477		
Conservative	Victoria Maloney	454		
Liberal Democrats	Michael Quinn	363		
Independent	Eamonn Fitzpatrick	169		
TUSC	Derek Pickup	58		
Turnout		1,534	38.10	
Labour gain from Liberal Democrats		Swing		

Kingsthorpe (1)
Party	Candidate	Votes	%	±%
Liberal Democrats	Sally Beardsworth	702		
Conservative	Michael O'Connor	581		
Labour	Arthur Whitford	331		
BNP	Raymond Beasley	92		
Turnout		1,719	28.88	
Liberal Democrats hold		Swing		

Nene Valley (2)
Party	Candidate	Votes	%	±%
Conservative	Michael Hill	1,790		
Conservative	Jonathan Nunn	1,596		
Independent	Liam Costello	1,056		
Liberal Democrats	John Crake	524		
Liberal Democrats	Cerri Glynane	425		
Turnout		3,218	41.15	
Conservative hold		Swing		
Conservative hold		Swing		

New Duston (2)
Party	Candidate	Votes	%	±%
Conservative	Matthew Goldby	1,714		
Conservative	John Caswell	1,614		
Labour	Jayne Croke	789		
Independent	David Huffadine-Smith	671		
UKIP	Malcolm McCarthur	387		
Liberal Democrats	Fern Conroy	271		
Liberal Democrats	Marion Minney	190		
Turnout		3,405	43.68	
Conservative hold		Swing		
Conservative hold		Swing		

Obelisk (1)
Party	Candidate	Votes	%	±%
Conservative	Mary Markham	371		
Labour	Janet Phillips	299		
Liberal Democrats	David Perkins	258		
UKIP	John Howsam	96		
Turnout		1,030	28.8	

Old Duston (2)
Party	Candidate	Votes	%	±%
Conservative	Timothy Hadland	1,134		
Conservative	Suryakant Patel	803		
Independent	David Green	642		
Liberal Democrats	Richard Taylor	513		
Independent	Henry Tuttle	361		
Labour	Francis Wire	344		
Liberal Democrats	Michelle Ledington	193		
UKIP	Kingsley Ratnasingham	155		
Turnout		2,701	44.18	
Conservative hold		Swing		
Conservative hold		Swing		

Park (1)
Party	Candidate	Votes	%	±%
Conservative	Norman Duncan	1,425		
Liberal Democrats	David Garlick	484		
Turnout		1,984	54.69	

Parklands (1)
Party	Candidate	Votes	%	±%
Conservative	Michael Hallam Jnr	1,026		
Liberal Democrats	Gary Phillips	410		
UKIP	Richard Burton	199		
CPA	Philip Bricher	46		
Turnout		1,717	46.48	
Conservative gain from Liberal Democrats		Swing		

Phippsville (1)
Party	Candidate	Votes	%	±%
Conservative	Anna King	555		
Liberal Democrats	Marianne Taylor	499		
Green	Marcus Rock	376		
Turnout		1,461	45.25	
Conservative hold		Swing		

Rectory Farm (1)
Party	Candidate	Votes	%	±%
Conservative	David Mackintosh	842		
Liberal Democrats	Michael Beardsworth	294		
Turnout		1,191	32.2	

Riverside (1)
Party	Candidate	Votes	%	±%
Conservative	Stephen Hibbert	537		
Labour	Janice Duffy	463		
Liberal Democrats	Veronica Meredith	125		
Turnout		1,135	32.86	

Rushmills (1)
Party	Candidate	Votes	%	±%
Conservative	Penelope Flavell	928		
Labour	Anne Wishart	384		
Liberal Democrats	Kevin Barron	146		
Turnout		1,470	43.54	

Semilong (1)
Party	Candidate	Votes	%	±%
Labour	Leslie Marriott	437		
Liberal Democrats	Sarah Ukdall	317		
Conservative	Peter Carol	222		
Independent	Steven Richards	146		
Turnout		1,138	30.71	
Labour hold		Swing		

Spencer (1)
Party	Candidate	Votes	%	±%
Labour	Gareth Eales	560		
Liberal Democrats	Jennifer Conroy	511		
Conservative	George Tyrrell	374		
Turnout		1,459	38.27	
Labour gain from Liberal Democrats		Swing		

Spring Park (1)
Party	Candidate	Votes	%	±%
Conservative	John Yates	707		
Liberal Democrats	Grant Bowles	531		
Labour	Barry Kirby	490		
Turnout		1,749	46.25	
Conservative hold		Swing		

St Davids (1)
Party	Candidate	Votes	%	±%
Labour	Nazim Choudary	452		
Conservative	Richard Cullis	282		
Liberal Democrats	Anthony Woods	246		
Turnout		992	29.09	
Labour gain from Liberal Democrats		Swing		

St James (1)
Party	Candidate	Votes	%	±%
Labour	Terence Wire	419		
Conservative	Andrew Kilbride	386		
Liberal Democrats	Julia Maddison	208		
Independent	Derek Jones	198		
Turnout		1,217	32.94	
Labour gain from Liberal Democrats		Swing		

Sunnyside (1)
Party	Candidate	Votes	%	±%
Conservative	Nilesh Parekh	443		
Liberal Democrats	Maria Crake	421		
Labour	Anamul Haque	359		
TUSC	Henry Fowler	56		
Turnout		1,288	39.89	

Talavera (2)
Party	Candidate	Votes	%	±%
Liberal Democrats	Dennis Meredith	868		
Labour	Joy Capstick	742		
Liberal Democrats	Prince Chaudhury	727		
Labour	Martin de Rosario	640		
Conservative	Sheila Roberts	424		
Conservative	Julie Rolfe	384		
UKIP	John Allen	288		
Turnout		2,348	30.63	

Trinity (1)
Party	Candidate	Votes	%	±%
Labour	Nahar Begum	448		
Liberal Democrats	Andrew Simpson	394		
Conservative	Eithwyn Jones	203		
Turnout		1,063	32.37	

Upton (2)
Party	Candidate	Votes	%	±%
Conservative	Alan Bottwood	900		
Conservative	Brian Sargeant	696		
Liberal Democrats	Richard Matthews	615		
Liberal Democrats	Scott Collins	565		
Turnout		1,578	39.95	

West Hunsbury (1)
Party	Candidate	Votes	%	±%
Conservative	Brian Oldham	961		
Liberal Democrats	Jill Hope	779		
CPA	Phillip Buchan	94		
Turnout		1,866	52.65	
Conservative gain from Liberal Democrats		Swing		

Westone (1)
Party	Candidate	Votes	%	±%
Conservative	Matthew Lynch	669		
Liberal Democrats	Charles Markham	520		
Labour	Titus Ajayi	339		
BNP	Stephen Osborne	105		
Turnout		1,652	49.61	
