= List of statutory instruments of the United Kingdom, 2018 =

This is a partial list of statutory instruments published in the United Kingdom in the year 2018.

- Seafarers (Transnational Information and Consultation, Collective Redundancies and Insolvency Miscellaneous Amendments) Regulations 2018 (SI 2018/26)
- Sub-national Transport Body (Transport for the North) Regulations 2018 (SI 2018/103)
- Fulfilment Businesses (Approval Scheme) Regulations 2018 (SI 2018/299), revoked and replaced by
  - Fulfilment Businesses Regulations 2018 (SI 2018/326)
- Investigatory Powers (Technical Capability) Regulations 2018 (SI 2018/353)
- Railways (Penalty Fares) Regulations 2018 (SI 2018/366)
- Police, Fire and Crime Commissioner for Northamptonshire (Fire and Rescue Authority) Order 2018 (SI 2018/1072)
- Employment Rights (Employment Particulars and Paid Annual Leave) (Amendment) Regulations 2018 (SI 2018/1378)
- Road Transport (International Passenger Services) Regulations 2018 (SI 2018/1395)
- Building (Amendment) Regulations 2018 (SI 2018/1230)

== See also ==
- List of statutory instruments of the United Kingdom
