= 1999 Northampton Borough Council election =

1999 UK local government election

← 1995	6 May 1999	2003 →

All 47 seats in the Northampton Borough Council 24 seats needed for a majority
	First party	Second party	Third party
Party	Labour	Liberal Democrats	Conservative
Seats won	28	11	8
Seat change	▼7	▲5	▲7
- Map showing the results of the 1999 Northampton Borough Council elections.
Council control before election
Labour
Council control after election
Labour

Elections to the Northampton Borough Council were held on 6 May 1999. The whole council was up for election with boundary changes since the last election in 1995 increasing the number of seats by 4. The Labour Party stayed in overall control of the council.

== Election result ==
Northampton local election result 1999
Party	Seats	Gains	Losses	Net gain/loss	Seats %	Votes %	Votes	+/−
Labour	28			-7	59.6			
Liberal Democrats	11			+5	23.4			
Conservative	8			+7	17.0			
Others	0			-1	0.0			

== Ward results ==
Numbers in parentheses indicate number of candidates to be elected.

Abington (2)
Party	Candidate	Votes	%	±%
Labour	Arthur McCutcheon	884		
Labour	Vivienne Dams	870		
Conservative	Keith Cumberpatch	492		
Conservative	Robert Mackley	492		
Liberal Democrats	Irene Markham	322		
Liberal Democrats	Philip Oakman	255		
UKIP	Dusan Torbica	56		
Turnout		3,371	26.6	

Billing (2)
Party	Candidate	Votes	%	±%
Labour	Mary Davies	678		
Labour	Margaret Pritchard	652		
Conservative	Jane Duncan	610		
Conservative	Maureen Hill	588		
Liberal Democrats	Toni Brennan	273		
Liberal Democrats	Christine Teulon	218		
Turnout		3,019	25.3	

Boughton Green (3)
Party	Candidate	Votes	%	±%
Liberal Democrats	Richard Baldwin	1,252		
Liberal Democrats	Norma Felstead	1,218		
Liberal Democrats	John Yates	1,232		
Labour	Barry Kirkby	766		
Labour	Neall O'Ceallaigh	672		
Labour	Peter Witt	664		
Conservative	Laurice Percival	370		
Conservative	John Cartwright	362		
Conservative	Alan Beale	349		
Turnout		5,653	33.1	

Castle (2)
Party	Candidate	Votes	%	±%
Labour	Lee Baron	1,050		
Labour	John Dickie	1,019		
Conservative	Alan Tebbutt	285		
Liberal Democrats	Steven Burgess	276		
Independent	Robert Butler	243		
Liberal Democrats	John Cox	227		
Turnout		3,100	24.7	

Delapre (2)
Party	Candidate	Votes	%	±%
Labour	Chaman Kalyan	897		
Labour	Ulric Gravesande	792		
Independent	Brendan Glynane	733		
Independent	Denise Kirkland	689		
Turnout		3,111	28.7	

East Hunsbury (2)
Party	Candidate	Votes	%	±%
Conservative	Judith Lill	794		
Conservative	Philip Larratt	759		
Labour	Berston Cuff	424		
Labour	Victor Dibosa	407		
Liberal Democrats	Mark Hooper	239		
Liberal Democrats	Jill Panebianco	214		
Turnout		2,837	23.0	

Eastfield (2)
Party	Candidate	Votes	%	±%
Labour	Michael Thomas	1,122		
Labour	John Rawlings	1,056		
Conservative	John McDermott	598		
Conservative	John Merkitt	536		
Liberal Democrats	Brian Dee	328		
Liberal Democrats	Philip Thornborow	251		
Turnout		3,891	30.4	

Ecton Brook (2)
Party	Candidate	Votes	%	±%
Labour	Idris David	586		
Labour	Debra Boss	559		
Conservative	Barry Dearsley	421		
Conservative	Graham Hawker	418		
Liberal Democrats	Leslie Felstead	210		
Liberal Democrats	Pauline Baldwin	182		
Turnout		2,376	23.3	

Headlands (2)
Party	Candidate	Votes	%	±%
Liberal Democrats	Charles Markham	1,108		
Liberal Democrats	Marion Allen	1,094		
Conservative	Rita-Ann Cumberpatch	775		
Labour	Timothy Hart	751		
Conservative	Jamie Lane	719		
Labour	Daniel Persuad	657		
Turnout		5,104	41.6	

Kingsley (2)
Party	Candidate	Votes	%	±%
Liberal Democrats	Andrew Simpson	1,133		
Liberal Democrats	Marianne Allen	1,093		
Labour	Anthea Mitchell	857		
Labour	Anjona Roy	835		
Conservative	Laura Axtell	312		
Conservative	Beryl Eldred	305		
UKIP	Michael Papworth	53		
Turnout		4,588	33.3	

Kingsthorpe (2)
Party	Candidate	Votes	%	±%
Liberal Democrats	Sally Beardsworth	1,162		
Liberal Democrats	Richard Church	1,090		
Labour	Janet Kirby	488		
Labour	Hilary Blackman	436		
Conservative	Brandon Eldred	368		
Conservative	Barry Wright	322		
Turnout		3,866	34.5	

Lumbertubs (2)
Party	Candidate	Votes	%	±%
Labour	Lee Mason	755		
Labour	Trevor Bailey	731		
Conservative	Carole Thurlow	313		
Conservative	Jeffrey Sarchet	297		
Liberal Democrats	Laurence Sumeray	177		
Turnout		2,273	20.3	

Nene Valley (2)
Party	Candidate	Votes	%	±%
Conservative	Colin Lill	1,006		
Conservative	Michael Hill	981		
Labour	Michael Jones	616		
Labour	Andrew Roberts	520		
Liberal Democrats	Tracey Marsh	273		
Liberal Democrats	Carl Squires	179		
Turnout		3,575	35.4	

New Duston (2)
Party	Candidate	Votes	%	±%
Labour	Francis Lilley	974		
Conservative	Stephen Stewart	878		
Labour	Denise O'Hora	812		
Conservative	Jonathan Nunn	787		
Liberal Democrats	Richard Cant	276		
Liberal Democrats	Martin Tilley	164		
Turnout		3,891	31.2	

Old Duston (2)
Party	Candidate	Votes	%	±%
Labour	Patricia Ford	1,138		
Labour	Alan Kingston	1,090		
Conservative	Donald Edwards	962		
Conservative	Barry Howard	895		
Liberal Democrats	Graham Lewis	242		
Liberal Democrats	Suzanne Battison	210		
Turnout		4,537	34.6	

Parklands (2)
Party	Candidate	Votes	%	±%
Conservative	William Massey	908		
Labour	Kenneth Dowsett	856		
Conservative	Ian McCann	831		
Labour	Iftikhar Choudary	766		
Liberal Democrats	Philippa Swain	296		
Liberal Democrats	Haydn Rees	292		
Turnout		3,949	33.4	

Spencer (2)
Party	Candidate	Votes	%	±%
Labour	Jaswant Baines	850		
Labour	John Gardner	845		
Conservative	Christopher Malpas	252		
Liberal Democrats	Michael Beardsworth	179		
Liberal Democrats	Jeffrey Allenby	178		
Turnout		2,304	21.7	

St Crispin (2)
Party	Candidate	Votes	%	±%
Labour	Ashley Riley	848		
Labour	Winston Strachan	777		
Conservative	Anthony Andreoli	328		
Liberal Democrats	Tina Harvey	288		
Liberal Democrats	Nicholas Starling	239		
Turnout		2,480	22.3	

St David's (2)
Party	Candidate	Votes	%	±%
Labour	Robina Foot	504		
Labour	Raoul Perry	490		
Liberal Democrats	Stephen O'Hare	316		
Liberal Democrats	Ian Wright	304		
Independent	Martin Bradshaw	202		
Conservative	Craig Baker	188		
Conservative	Angela Wright	156		
Turnout		2,160	25.9	

St James (2)
Party	Candidate	Votes	%	±%
Labour	Leslie Marriott	916		
Labour	Terence Wire	894		
Independent	James Smith	676		
Turnout		2,486	25.9	

Thorplands (2)
Party	Candidate	Votes	%	±%
Labour	Leslie Patterson	731		
Labour	Michael Boss	661		
Liberal Democrats	Nicolas Kent	347		
Liberal Democrats	Robert Oakman	321		
Turnout		2,060	20.2	

Weston (2)
Party	Candidate	Votes	%	±%
Conservative	Timothy Hadland	1,402		
Conservative	Helen Kennedy	1,383		
Labour	Jean Lineker	752		
Labour	Mohd Riaz	645		
Liberal Democrats	James Cramp	320		
Liberal Democrats	Evelyn Grose	280		
Turnout		4,782	28.8	

West Hunsbury (2)
Party	Candidate	Votes	%	±%
Liberal Democrats	Richard Matthews	632		
Liberal Democrats	Jill Hope	616		
Conservative	Charles Hugheston-Roberts	510		
Conservative	Charles Morgan	481		
Labour	Mary Thubron	275		
Labour	Alec Dyer-Atkins	274		
UKIP	Derek Roland	61		
Turnout		2,849	36.4	
