= 2007 Northampton Borough Council election =

2007 UK local government election

← 2003	3 May 2007	2011 →

All 47 seats in the Northampton Borough Council 24 seats needed for a majority
	First party	Second party	Third party
Party	Liberal Democrats	Conservative	Labour
Last election	17	19	11
Seats won	26	15	5
Seat change	▲9	▼4	▼6
Popular vote	38,400	31,044	19,462
Percentage	40.0%	32.4%	20.3%
- Map showing the results of the 2007 Northampton Borough Council elections.
Council control before election
No overall control
Council control after election
Liberal Democrats

Elections to Northampton Borough Council were held on 3 May 2007. The whole council was up for election and the Liberal Democrats gained overall control of the council from no overall control.

== Election result ==
Northampton local election result 2007
Party	Seats	Gains	Losses	Net gain/loss	Seats %	Votes %	Votes	+/−
Liberal Democrats	26	10	1	+9	55.3	40.0	38,400	+5.0
Conservative	15	1	5	-4	31.9	32.4	31,044	-4.8
Labour	5	1	7	-6	10.6	20.3	19,462	-5.3
Independent	1	1	0	+1	2.1	2.0	1,954	+1.0
Green	0	0	0	0	0.0	1.9	1,838	+0.9
BNP	0	0	0	0	0.0	1.3	1,205	+1.3
SOS! Voters Against Over-development of Northampton	0	0	0	0	0.0	1.2	1,133	+1.2
Save Our NHS Group	0	0	0	0	0.0	0.7	667	+0.7
CPA	0	0	0	0	0.0	0.2	216	+0.2

== Ward results ==
Abington (2)
Party	Candidate	Votes	%	±%
Liberal Democrats	Irene Markham	949		
Liberal Democrats	Brian Hoare	929		
Labour	Steve O'Connor	413		
Labour	Trevor Owen	372		
Conservative	Ray Kelly	364		
Conservative	Brian Sargeant	318		
Green	Jac Higgs	213		
Green	Marcus Rock	183		
Turnout		3,741		
Liberal Democrats hold		Swing		
Liberal Democrats hold		Swing		

Billing (2)
Party	Candidate	Votes	%	±%
Conservative	David Palethorpe	941		
Conservative	Christopher Malpas	855		
Labour	Trevor Balley	511		
Labour	Dvija Mehta	397		
BNP	Rob Walker	309		
Liberal Democrats	Gary Phillips	280		
Liberal Democrats	Joe Efosa	245		
Independent	Ray Clements	240		
Turnout		3,778		
Conservative hold		Swing		
Conservative hold		Swing		

Boughton Green (3)
Party	Candidate	Votes	%	±%
Liberal Democrats	John Yates	1,899		
Liberal Democrats	Trini Crake	1,845		
Liberal Democrats	David Perkins	1,779		
Conservative	Lloyd Emmerson	779		
Conservative	Alison Norman	762		
Conservative	Laura Norman	759		
Labour	Janet Phillips	482		
Labour	Timothy Hart	459		
Labour	Arthur Whitford	429		
SOS! Voters Against Over-development of Northampton	Eddie Dale	281		
Turnout		9,474		
Liberal Democrats hold		Swing		
Liberal Democrats hold		Swing		
Liberal Democrats hold		Swing		

Castle (2)
Party	Candidate	Votes	%	±%
Independent	Tony Clarke	601		
Labour	Tess Scott	447		
Liberal Democrats	Christopher Swinn	425		
Liberal Democrats	Steve Winder	383		
Independent	Peter Evans	362		
Conservative	Gordon Hemphill	245		
Conservative	Darren Gasson	233		
Independent	Eamonn Fitzpatrick	210		
Green	Sarah Curtis	187		
Turnout		3,093		
Independent gain from Labour		Swing		
Labour hold		Swing		

Delapre (2)
Party	Candidate	Votes	%	±%
Liberal Democrats	Brendan Glynane	591		
Conservative	Kevin Reeve	519		
Labour	Chaman Kalyan	469		
BNP	Larry Nunn	388		
Labour	Steve Croke	387		
Liberal Democrats	John Rawlings	368		
Conservative	Ivan Sljivic	312		
Green	James Fearnley	209		
Turnout		3,243		
Liberal Democrats hold		Swing		
Conservative gain from Liberal Democrats		Swing		

East Hunsbury (2)
Party	Candidate	Votes	%	±%
Conservative	Judith Lill	1,087		
Conservative	Phil Larratt	1,022		
Liberal Democrats	Chris Collins	385		
Labour	Robert Burnell	354		
Liberal Democrats	Jill Panebianco	352		
Labour	Sally Fairbrace	278		
Turnout		3,483		
Conservative hold		Swing		
Conservative hold		Swing		

Eastfield (2)
Party	Candidate	Votes	%	±%
Liberal Democrats	Jean Hawkins	1,170		
Liberal Democrats	Scott Collins	1,074		
Labour	Ulric Gavesande	556		
Conservative	David Acock	547		
Labour	Barry Kirby	513		
Conservative	Alan Wright	501		
Green	Anthony Lochmuller	189		
Turnout		4,550		
Liberal Democrats gain from Conservative		Swing		
Liberal Democrats gain from Conservative		Swing		

Ecton Brook (2)
Party	Candidate	Votes	%	±%
Conservative	Jamie Lane	624		
Labour	Keith Davies	600		
Conservative	Yousuf Miah	533		
Labour	Winston Strachan	483		
Liberal Democrats	Gareth Jones	311		
Liberal Democrats	Ruth Williams	267		
CPA	Suzanne Webb	90		
Turnout		2,908		
Conservative hold		Swing		
Labour gain from Conservative		Swing		

Headlands (2)
Party	Candidate	Votes	%	±%
Liberal Democrats	David Garlick	1,513		
Liberal Democrats	Brian Markham	1,502		
Conservative	Graham Hawker	703		
Conservative	Laura Hutchings	645		
Labour	Nicola Turner	396		
Labour	Chris Grethe	356		
Turnout		5,115		
Liberal Democrats hold		Swing		
Liberal Democrats hold		Swing		

Kingsley (2)
Party	Candidate	Votes	%	±%
Liberal Democrats	Andrew Simpson	1,253		
Liberal Democrats	Marianne Taylor	1,184		
Labour	Nova Keown	439		
Labour	Jayne Croke	437		
Conservative	Nick Sullivan	400		
Conservative	Gary Austin	393		
Green	Muriel Upton	146		
Turnout		4,449		
Liberal Democrats hold		Swing		
Liberal Democrats hold		Swing		

Kingsthorpe (2)
Party	Candidate	Votes	%	±%
Liberal Democrats	Sally Beardsworth	1,601		
Liberal Democrats	Richard Church	1,381		
Conservative	Alan Beal	318		
Conservative	Eithwyn Jones	274		
Labour	Steve Thomas	216		
Labour	Hilary Blackman	215		
SOS! Voters Against Over-development of Northampton	Paul Withrington	206		
Turnout		4,211		
Liberal Democrats hold		Swing		
Liberal Democrats hold		Swing		

Lumbertubs (2)
Party	Candidate	Votes	%	±%
Labour	Joy Capstick	622		
Labour	Lee Mason	575		
Liberal Democrats	Grant Bowles	430		
Liberal Democrats	Eva Down	427		
Conservative	David Mackintosh	327		
Conservative	David Usmar	290		
BNP	Penny Blundell	256		
Save Our NHS Group	Harry Tuttle	196		
Turnout		3,123		
Labour hold		Swing		
Labour hold		Swing		

Nene Valley (2)
Party	Candidate	Votes	%	±%
Conservative	Michael Hill	1,635		
Conservative	Colin Lill	1,556		
Labour	Danny Beales	545		
Liberal Democrats	Jackie Glynane	543		
Liberal Democrats	Barbara Bream	503		
Turnout		4,782		
Conservative hold		Swing		
Conservative hold		Swing		

New Duston (2)
Party	Candidate	Votes	%	±%
Conservative	Liz Tavener	1,196		
Conservative	John Caswell	977		
Independent	David Huffadine-Smith	541		
Labour	Lee Bruley	476		
Labour	Clare Pike	432		
SOS! Voters Against Over-development in Northampton	Susan Edkins	293		
Liberal Democrats	Eamonn Lindsell	226		
Liberal Democrats	Michael Maher	172		
CPA	Faith Bricher	32		
Turnout		4,345		
Conservative hold		Swing		
Conservative hold		Swing		

Old Duston (2)
Party	Candidate	Votes	%	±%
Conservative	Don Edwards	899		
Conservative	Michael Hoare	872		
Save Our NHS Group	Dave Green	471		
Labour	Ricky Matthews	419		
Labour	Frank Lilley	368		
Liberal Democrats	Mike Beardsworth	264		
SOS! Voters Against Over-development of Northampton	Karen Dare	255		
Liberal Democrats	Martin Taylor	208		
Turnout		3,756		
Conservative hold		Swing		
Conservative hold		Swing		

Parklands (2)
Party	Candidate	Votes	%	±%
Liberal Democrats	Malcolm Mildren	1,568		
Liberal Democrats	Portia Wilson	1,548		
Conservative	Mike Hallam	896		
Conservative	Brandon Aldred	867		
Labour	Wayne Keown	325		
Labour	Gavin Morgan	299		
CPA	Colin Bricher	55		
CPA	Timothy Webb	39		
Turnout		5,597		
Liberal Democrats gain from Conservative		Swing		
Liberal Democrats gain from Conservative		Swing		

Spencer (2)
Party	Candidate	Votes	%	±%
Liberal Democrats	Roger Conroy	1,077		
Liberal Democrats	Mel De Cruz	940		
Labour	Anjona Roy	478		
Labour	Alan Scott	449		
Conservative	Amy Cena	239		
Conservative	Huseyin Alti	193		
SOS! Voters Against Over-development of Northampton	John Harrisson	98		
Turnout		3,474		
Liberal Democrats gain from Labour		Swing		
Liberal Democrats gain from Labour		Swing		

St. Crispin (2)
Party	Candidate	Votes	%	±%
Conservative	Penny Flavell	563		
Labour	Ifty Choudary	540		
Labour	Arthur McCutcheon	527		
Conservative	Stephen Mold	462		
Liberal Democrats	Phillip Buchan	323		
Green	Hannah Gibson	261		
Green	Julie Hawkins	230		
Liberal Democrats	Daniel Jwanczuk	224		
Turnout		3,130		
Conservative hold		Swing		
Labour hold		Swing		

St. David (2)
Party	Candidate	Votes	%	±%
Liberal Democrats	Jane Hollis	697		
Liberal Democrats	Tony Woods	626		
Labour	Catherine Russell	486		
Labour	Ven Subbarayan	472		
Conservative	Paul Taylor	203		
Conservative	Bernie Eldred	201		
Turnout		2,685		
Liberal Democrats hold		Swing		
Liberal Democrats hold		Swing		

St. James (2)
Party	Candidate	Votes	%	±%
Liberal Democrats	Jenny Conroy	719		
Liberal Democrats	Pam Varnsverry	678		
Labour	Leslie Marriott	636		
Labour	Ian McCann	634		
Conservative	Fran Wire	622		
Conservative	Suresh Patel	595		
Turnout		3,884		
Liberal Democrats gain from Labour		Swing		
Liberal Democrats gain from Labour		Swing		

Thorplands (2)
Party	Candidate	Votes	%	±%
Liberal Democrats	Dennis Meredith	903		
Liberal Democrats	Sadik Chaudhury	808		
Labour	Les Patterson	492		
Labour	Mike Boss	480		
BNP	Jim Avery	252		
Conservative	Sheila Roberts	229		
Conservative	Carole Thurlow	229		
Turnout		3,393		
Liberal Democrats gain from Labour		Swing		
Liberal Democrats gain from Labour		Swing		

West Hunsbury (2)
Party	Candidate	Votes	%	±%
Liberal Democrats	Richard Matthews	1,476		
Liberal Democrats	Paul Varnsverry	1,287		
Conservative	Brian Oldam	953		
Conservative	Matthew Golby	916		
Labour	Jaime Barron	211		
Turnout		4,843		
Liberal Democrats hold		Swing		
Liberal Democrats hold		Swing		

Weston (2)
Party	Candidate	Votes	%	±%
Conservative	Jane Duncan	1,528		
Conservative	Timothy Hadland	1,462		
Liberal Democrats	Kevin Barron	596		
Liberal Democrats	Andreas Christodoulou	471		
Labour	Debra Boss	451		
Labour	Christopher Porter	336		
Green	Jonathan Hornett	220		
Turnout		5,064		
Conservative hold		Swing		
Conservative hold		Swing		
