= Stephen Mold =

English Conservative politician

Northamptonshire Police and Crime Commissioner (until 2018) Northamptonshire Police, Fire and Crime Commissioner (since 2019)
- In office 12 May 2016 – 8 May 2024
- Preceded by: Adam Simmonds
- Succeeded by: Danielle Stone

Personal details
- Born: January 1968 (age 58) Banbury, Oxfordshire, UK
- Party: Conservative
- Profession: Politician

Stephen Graham Mold (born January 1968) is an English businessman and former Conservative politician. He served as the Police, Fire and Crime Commissioner for Northamptonshire from 2016 to 2024. He was elected in May 2016, succeeding Adam Simmonds, and was re-elected in 2021. He was succeeded by Danielle Stone in May 2024.

== Early life ==
Stephen Mold was born and raised in the United Kingdom. His educational background includes studies in business and management. Mold had a career in the private sector, focusing on technology, leadership and management.

In the 2010 general election, he was the Conservative candidate for Derby North, losing by 613 votes. He had stood unsuccessfully in the 2007 Northampton Borough Council election. He was elected as a district councillor in South Northamptonshire in 2015 but resigned in 2016 after he was elected as police and crime commissioner.

== Business career ==
Mold is a director of M2 Innovation Ltd, a private limited company incorporated in April 2024 and registered under the SIC code for retail sale via mail order houses or via the Internet. He is also a director of Euro Securitas Ltd, a private limited company incorporated in March 2025 and registered under the SIC code for security systems service activities.

== Election and mandate ==
Mold was elected as the Police and Crime Commissioner (PFCC) for Northamptonshire in May 2016. He was re-elected in May 2021. On 1 January 2019, governance of the Northamptonshire Fire and Rescue Service (NFRS) transferred to Mold as the Northamptonshire Police, Fire and Crime Commissioner after the Home Secretary approved the Local Business Case to transfer governance arrangements from Northamptonshire County Council.

== Controversies ==
As PFCC, Mold purchased a building at Earls Barton for use as a repair facility for police and fire service vehicles. Purchased for £3.3 million in 2021, the office of the PFCC spent a further £1.3 million on VAT, stamp duty, and design work. In 2023 the building was put up for sale at a loss. The aborted project wasted almost £400,000.

In July 2023, Mold appointed Nicci Marzec to the position of interim fire chief for Northamptonshire following the resignation of Mark Jones. The appointment was criticised by the Fire Brigades Union due to Marzec's lack of "operational understanding of the role". Marzec stood down after ten days in office, with Mold citing that their "friendship" had "become the story". However, other media outlets reported that the two were in a long-term relationship, forcing Mold to issue a denial.

In March 2024, Mold announced he would not stand for re-election in the upcoming May election, after a scandal where he used a sexist slur against the new fire chief for Northamptonshire
