= Northamptonshire Fire and Rescue Service =

Fire and rescue service in England

Operational area
- Country: England
- County: Northamptonshire
- Address: Darby Close, Park Farm Industrial Estate, Wellingborough, NN8 6GS

Agency overview
- Annual calls: 13,174 (2017-18)
- Commissioner: Danielle Stone
- Chief Fire Officer: Nikki Watson

Facilities and equipment
- Stations: 22

Website
- www.northantsfire.gov.uk

The Northamptonshire Fire and Rescue Service (NFRS) is a fire and rescue service covering the county of Northamptonshire, United Kingdom. NFRS covers an area of 948 square miles (2,460 km^{2}) area with a population of around 750,000.

== History ==
Northamptonshire Fire and Rescue Service was founded in 1974 when the former Northamptonshire Fire Brigade and Northampton Borough Fire Brigade (both formed in 1948 by the Fire Services Act 1947) merged.

In April 2021, Moulton Logistics Centre closed down, leaving Moulton Fire Station and the service's workshops behind. The new headquarters for the service is now shared with Northamptonshire Police, at a new site in Wellingborough.

== Organisation ==
Since 2019, the fire service has been overseen by the Northamptonshire Police, Fire and Crime Commissioner. It was previous overseen by Northamptonshire County Council.

NFRS has 22 fire stations, with 28 fire engines, a headquarters in Wellingborough, and an administration hub in Kettering which is shared with Northamptonshire Police. Its firefighters are split 62% wholetime and 38% retained (on-call).

== Performance ==
In November 2018, an inspection of NFRS by Her Majesty's Inspectorate of Constabulary and Fire & Rescue Services (HMICFRS) found that the service was routinely operating below the safe number of fire engines needing to cover the county. It also found that firefighter training records were incomplete and the service could not assure itself that they all had the necessary safety-critical skills. Three follow-up visits by HMICFRS in 2019 and 2020, allowed them to announce in March 2021 that they were satisfied with NFRS progress.

Every fire and rescue service in England and Wales is periodically subjected to a statutory inspection by HMICFRS. The inspections investigate how well the service performs in each of three areas. On a scale of outstanding, good, requires improvement and inadequate, Northamptonshire Fire and Rescue Service was rated as follows:

HMICFRS Inspection Northamptonshire
Area	Rating 2018/19	Rating 2021/22	Description
Effectiveness	Requires improvement	Good	How effective is the fire and rescue service at keeping people safe and secure from fire and other risks?
Efficiency	Requires improvement	Good	How efficient is the fire and rescue service at keeping people safe and secure from fire and other risks?
People	Requires improvement	Requires improvement	How well does the fire and rescue service look after its people?

== See also ==
- List of British firefighters killed in the line of duty
