= Leicestershire Police =

English territorial police force

- Leicestershire Police logo
- Motto: Protecting our communities

Agency overview
- Formed: 1839; 187 years ago
- Employees: 3256
- Annual budget: £169.6 million

Jurisdictional structure
- Operations jurisdiction: Leicestershire, Leicester, Rutland, UK
- Map of Leicestershire Police's jurisdiction
- Area: 2,538 km^{2} (980 square miles)
- Population: Over 1 million

Operational structure
- Overseen by: His Majesty's Inspectorate of Constabulary and Fire & Rescue Services; Independent Office for Police Conduct
- Headquarters: Enderby
- Sworn members: 2,089 (of which 304 are Special Constables)
- Police and Crime Commissioner responsible: Rupert Matthews, (REF)
- Agency executive: David Sandall, Temporary Chief constable
- Child agency: East Midlands Operational Support Service
- Local policing units: 15

Website
- www.leics.police.uk

Leicestershire Police is the territorial police force responsible for policing the counties of Leicestershire and Rutland in England. Its headquarters are at Enderby, Leicestershire.

== History ==
Leicestershire Police was formed in 1839. In 1951 it amalgamated with Rutland Constabulary to form Leicestershire and Rutland Constabulary and in 1967 merged with Leicester City Police to form Leicester and Rutland Constabulary. After the Local Government Act 1972 came into force in 1974 it was renamed Leicestershire Constabulary. In 2012 it changed to Leicestershire Police to be 'in keeping with modern policing'.

In 1965, Leicestershire and Rutland Constabulary had an establishment of 748 officers and an actual strength of 659.

Proposals made by the Home Secretary on 20 March 2006, would have seen the force merge with the other four East Midlands forces to form a strategic police force for the entire region. These plans were dropped in 2007.

In 2015, the force attempted to carry out a covert CCTV face recognition surveillance operation at the Download Festival, in which festival-goers would have their faces compared with a database of custody images, and only informed about the surveillance afterwards. The operation was inadvertently revealed in the magazine Police Oracle before the festival took place. The aim of the operation was to identify organised gangs of pickpockets deliberately targeting festivals across Europe.

=== Chief constables ===
As of November 2022 the chief constable is Rob Nixon.

The chief constables of Leicestershire have been:

- 1839–1876: Frederick Goodyer (first Chief Constable of Leicestershire)
- 1876–1889: Captain Roland Vincent Sylvester Grimston
- 1889–1928: Edward Holmes
- 1928–1949: Major Cecil Eagles Lynch-Blosse
- 1950–1972: John A Taylor
- 1972–1986: Alan Goodson
- 1986–1993: Michael John Hirst
- 1993–1997: Keith Povey
- 1997–2001: David Wyrko
- 2001–2009: Matt Baggott
- 2010–2022: Simon Cole
- 2022–2025: Rob Nixon
- 2025-present David Sandall (acting)

=== Officers killed in the line of duty ===
The Police Roll of Honour Trust and Police Memorial Trust list and commemorate all British police officers killed in the line of duty. Since its establishment in 1984, the Police Memorial Trust has erected 50 memorials nationally to some of those officers.

The following officers of Leicestershire Police are listed by the Trust as having died attempting to prevent, stop or solve a crime:

- PCs Bryan Reginald Moore and Andrew Carl Munn, 2002 (fatally injured when their vehicle was rammed during a police pursuit)
- Sergeant Brian Dawson, 1975 (shot dead upon arrival at reports of a man firing into the street)
- PC William Adiel Wilkinson, 1903 (shot dead in ambush by men who bore police a grudge)
- PC Thomas George Barrett, 1886 (beaten to death by a man he spoke to about non-payment of a fine).

== Local Policing Units ==
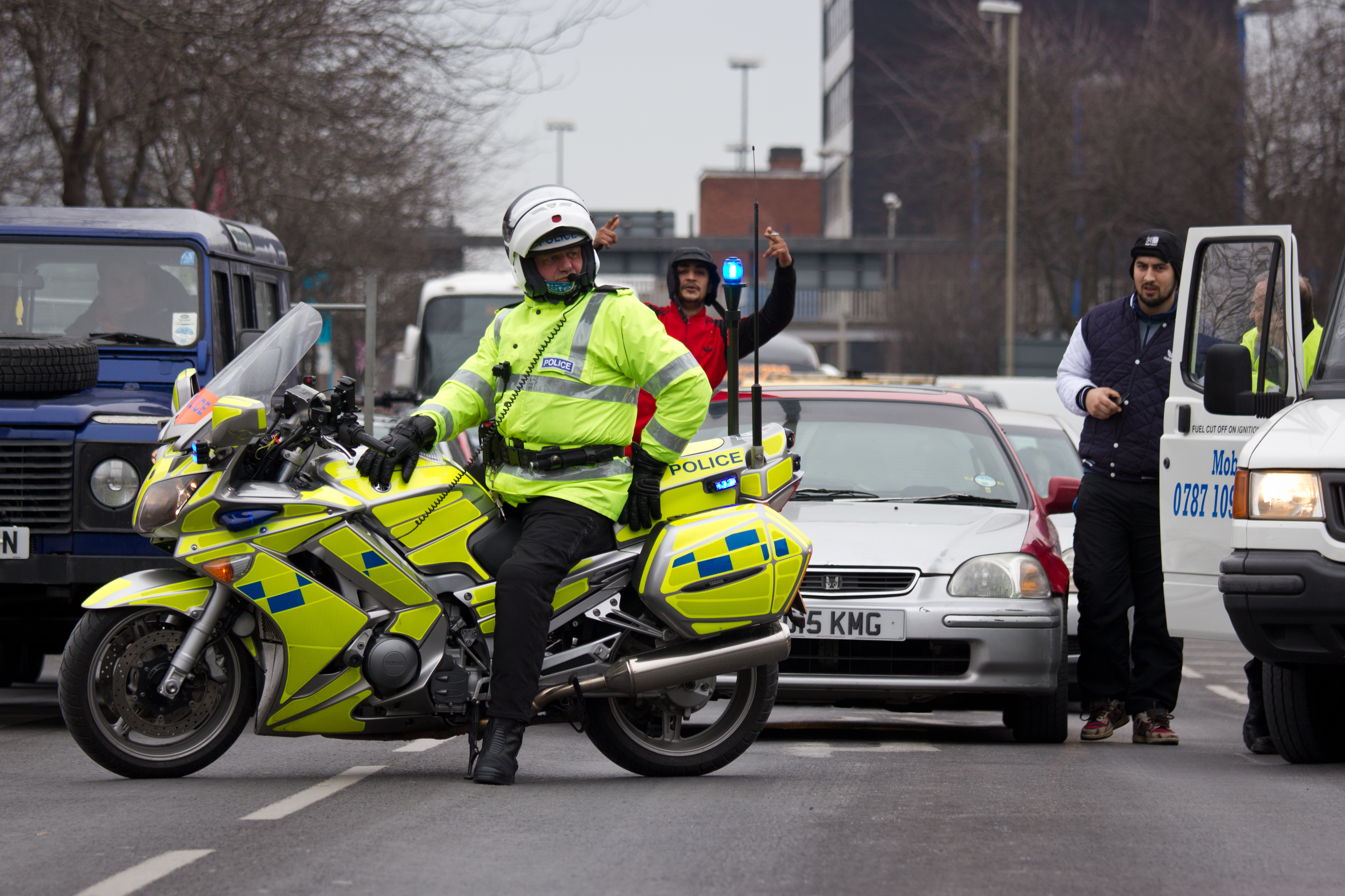
An officer on patrol in 2012

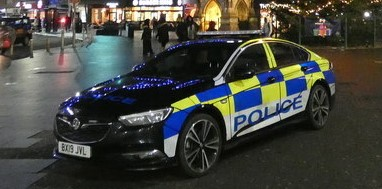
Leicestershire Police Vauxhall Insignia pictured in 2019

The local policing units for Leicestershire Police are as follows:

City:

- City Centre – Mansfield House
- City South – Euston Street
- City East – Highfields, Keyham Lane
- City West – Beaumont Leys, Hinckley Road

County:

- North West Leicestershire – Coalville
- Charnwood – Loughborough
- Melton & Rutland – Melton Mowbray
- Hinckley & Blaby – Braunstone, Hinckley
- Harborough – Market Harborough
- Oadby and Wigston – Wigston

== Uniform ==
- Black operational shirt for Constables and a blue operational shirt for PCSOs
- Epaulettes (black for Officers and blue for PCSOs) showing name and collar number
- Black operational combat trousers
- White operational shirt for senior officers and ceremonial use
- Custodian helmet or bowler hat for constables and sergeants
- Peaked hat or bowler for PCSOs
- White peaked cap for officers attached to the Roads Policing Unit (RPU)
- Peaked caps or bowlers for senior officers
- Custodian helmet for male officers and bowler hat for females
- Reflective or black protective body armour vest
- Modular carriage system for body armour or tactical belt to carry equipment

== Coat of arms ==
On 20 September 1968 the Leicester and Rutland Police Authority were granted armorial bearings by the College of Arms. The arms are blazoned as follows:

Per fess Azure and Vert, on a fess Argent between in chief two cinquefoils pierced Ermine and in base a horseshoe Or, a fox courant proper.

The shield featured charges from the arms of the three areas policed by the authority: a fox from the crest of Leicestershire County Council, ermine pierced cinquefoils from the arms of the City of Leicester and a golden horseshoe for Rutland County Council. Following local government reorganisation in 1974 the arms were transferred to Leicestershire County Council for the use of the police committee by royal licence dated 18 November 1974. With the introduction of police and crime commissioners in 2012 replacing the role of the county council, the arms were transferred a second time on 12 February 2013 to the Chief Constable of Leicestershire as a corporation sole for the use of the Leicestershire Police.

== PEEL inspection 2022 ==
Her Majesty's Inspectorate of Constabulary and Fire & Rescue Services (HMICFRS) conducts a periodic police effectiveness, efficiency and legitimacy (PEEL) inspection of each police service's performance. In its latest PEEL inspection, Leicestershire Police was rated as follows:

	Outstanding	Good	Adequate	Requires Improvement	Inadequate
2021/22 rating	Recording data about crime; Preventing crime; Protecting vulnerable people	Treatment of the public; Managing offenders; Developing a positive workplace; Good use of resources	Investigating crime; Responding to the public		

== See also ==
- Leicestershire Police and Crime Commissioner
- List of law enforcement agencies in the United Kingdom, Crown Dependencies and British Overseas Territories
- Law enforcement in the United Kingdom
