= Northamptonshire Police, Fire and Crime Commissioner =

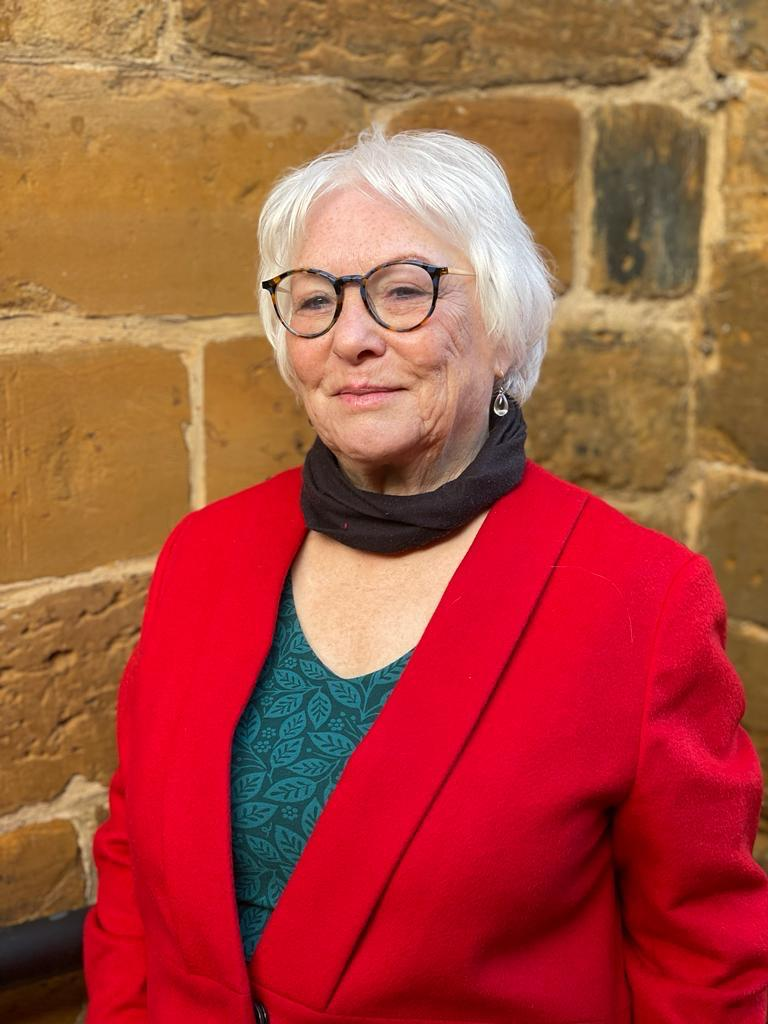
- Incumbent; Danielle Stone since 9 May 2024
- Northamptonshire Police and Northamptonshire Fire and Rescue Service
- Abbreviation: PFCC
- Reports to: The Northamptonshire Police, Fire and Crime Panel
- Appointer: Electorate of Northamptonshire
- Term length: 4 years
- Constituting instrument: Police Reform and Social Responsibility Act 2011
- Formation: 1 January 2019
- First holder: Stephen Mold
- Salary: £76,300 GBP
- Website: https://www.northantspfcc.org.uk

The Northamptonshire Police, Fire and Crime Commissioner (PFCC) is the elected official charged with overseeing Northamptonshire Police and the Northamptonshire Fire and Rescue Service and ensuring both, the police and the fire service are operating efficiently and effectively within the county of Northamptonshire.

The current PFCC is Danielle Stone. A Labour and Co-operative candidate, she was elected in 2024.

The previous PFCC was Stephen Mold; he assumed office on 5 May 2016 as the Police and Crime Commissioner, before the role began to govern the fire service on 1 January 2019 and became formally known as the "Police, Fire and Crime Commissioner".

== Police force ==
The PFCC is responsible for the totality of policing within Northamptonshire and holding the chief constable accountable for their actions. Northamptonshire Police remain responsible for the operational side of law enforcement within the county, whereas the commissioner is mainly responsible for the financial and political side.

=== Police and crime plan ===
Every term, the PFCC is to create a Police and Crime Plan which will outlay their plans for budgeting, strategy and performance monitoring for Northamptonshire Police.

== Fire and rescue service ==
Police, Fire and Crime Commissioner for Northamptonshire (Fire and Rescue Authority) Order 2018
- Statutory Instrument
- Parliament of the United Kingdom
- Citation: SI 2018/1072

Dates
- Made: 10 October 2018
- Laid before Parliament: 12 October 2018
- Commencement: 1 January 2019

Other legislation
- Made under: Fire and Rescue Services Act 2004

Text of statute as originally enacted

As a result of the Police, Fire and Crime Commissioner for Northamptonshire (Fire and Rescue Authority) Order 2018 (SI 2018/1072) and as of 1 January 2019, the governance of Northamptonshire Fire and Rescue Service is the responsibility of the PFCC. Prior to this change, it was the responsibility of 57 council members within the Northamptonshire County Council.

=== Fire and rescue plan ===
Every term, the PFCC is also expected to create a Fire and Rescue Plan which will outlay their plans for improvements and budgeting for Northamptonshire Fire and Rescue Service.

== List of commissioners ==
| Name | Political party | From | To |
|---|---|---|---|
| Adam Simmonds | Conservative | 22 November 2012 | 11 May 2016 |
| Stephen Mold | Conservative | 12 May 2016 | 8 May 2024 |
| Danielle Stone | Labour Co-op | 9 May 2024 | Incumbent |

== See also ==
- British government departments
- Home Office
- Ministry of Justice
- Home Secretary
- Shadow Home Secretary
