= Danielle Stone (police commissioner) =

British politician and Police & Fire Commissioner

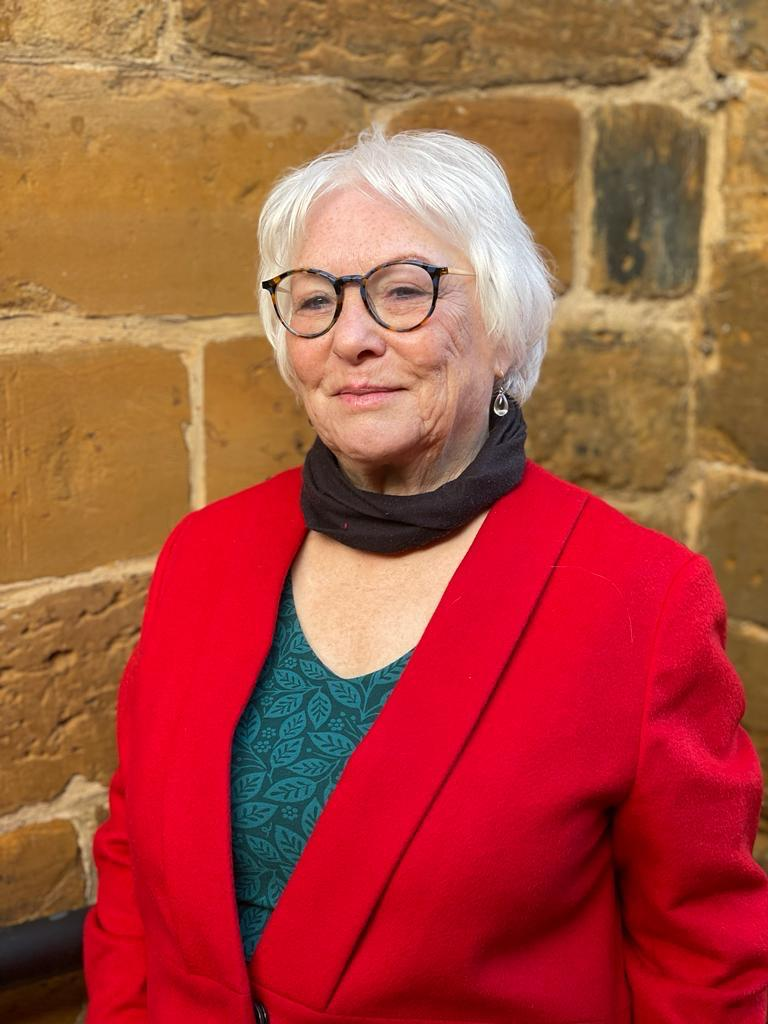

Northamptonshire Police, Fire and Crime Commissioner
- Incumbent
- Assumed office 9 May 2024
- Preceded by: Stephen Mold

Member of West Northamptonshire Council for Castle
- In office 1 April 2021 – 1 May 2025 Serving with Jamal Alwahabi and Enam Haque
- Preceded by: Office established
- Succeeded by: Fartun Ismail, Muna Cali, Enam Haque

Northamptonshire County Councillor for Abington and Phippsville
- In office 2 May 2013 – 31 March 2021

Personal details
- Party: Labour
- Profession: Politician
- Website: https://www.daniellestone.co.uk/

Danielle Stone is the Northamptonshire Police, Fire and Crime Commissioner and a former councillor for West Northamptonshire Council and Northamptonshire County Council.

== Political career ==
=== Councillor ===
Danielle Stone was elected to the Northamptonshire County Council in 2013 for Abington and Phippsville, and was re-elected in 2017. Northamptonshire County Council was dissolved in late March 2021, when she stood as the Labour candidate for the Castle ward of West Northamptonshire Council in May 2021, being elected with 1,407 votes.

=== Police Fire Crime Commissioner ===
Danielle Stone was elected as the Northamptonshire Police, Fire and Crime Commissioner in the 2024 Northamptonshire police, fire and crime commissioner election representing the Labour Party. The previous PFCC, Stephen Mold of the Conservative Party did not stand for re-election.
