= 2015 Northampton Borough Council election =

2015 UK local government election

- 7 May 2015

All 45 seats in the Northampton Borough Council 23 seats needed for a majority
	First party	Second party	Third party
Party	Conservative	Labour	Liberal Democrats
Last election	26	15	4
Seats won	26	17	2
Seat change	Steady	▲2	▼2
Popular vote	55,411	41,704	15,471
Percentage	41.9%	31.5%	11.7%
- Map showing the results of the 2015 Northampton Borough Council elections.
Council control before election
Conservative
Council control after election
Conservative

The 2015 Northampton Borough Council election took place on 7 May 2015 as a four-yearly public decision to elect all members of the council. This took place on the same day as other local elections and the 2015 United Kingdom general election – when there is a general election on the same day as the local elections, turnout across the country is almost always higher than if there is no general election. Voters could cast between one and three votes depending on the number of councillors per ward.

== Election result ==
Northampton local election result 2015
Party	Seats	Gains	Losses	Net gain/loss	Seats %	Votes %	Votes	+/−
Conservative	26	0	0	0	57.8	41.9	55,411	
Labour	17	2	0	+2	37.8	31.5	41,704	
Liberal Democrats	2	0	2	-2	4.4	11.7	15,471	
UKIP	0	0	0	0	0.0	10.2	13,458	
Independent	0	0	0	0	0.0	1.8	2,424	
Green	0	0	0	0	0.0	2.7	3,582	
Northampton - Save Our Public Services	0	0	0	0	0.0	1.0	1,014	
BNP	0	0	0	0	0.0	0.3	279	
Eccentric Party of Great Britain	0	0	0	0	0.0	0.1	63	

== Ward results ==
The number in brackets after the ward name is the number of councillors to be elected. An asterisk after the name (*) indicates the candidate was elected. Candidates are listed in order of number of votes. The wards and the numbers of candidates to be elected were both the same as for the 2011 borough election. There were 45 seats for election in total on the borough council, as in 2011.

NOTE: Ballot Papers and Turnout missing from the official records as at 14 May 2015 for East Hunsbury, Nene Valley, Rushmills, Upton and West Hunsbury.

Abington (2)
Party	Candidate	Votes	%	±%
Conservative	Tony Ansell	1,661	38.8	
Labour	Zoe Smith	1,567	36.6	
Labour	Jamal Alwahabi	1,366		
Conservative	Iftikhar Choudary	888		
Green	Drew Gray	719	16.8	
Liberal Democrats	Jill Panebianco	339	7.9	
Liberal Democrats	Regina Rogolska	185		
Turnout		4,286	58.86	
Conservative hold		Swing		
Labour hold		Swing		

Billing (2)
Party	Candidate	Votes	%	±%
Conservative	Andrew Kilbride	1,670	39.3	
Conservative	Christopher Malpas	1,605		
Labour	Anthea Mitchell	1,198	28.2	
UKIP	Leesa Rogers	1,045	24.6	
Labour	Winston Strachan	967		
Liberal Democrats	Tahmina Chaudhury	338	8.0	
Turnout		4,084	61.64	
Conservative hold		Swing		
Conservative hold		Swing		

Boothville (1)
Party	Candidate	Votes	%	±%
Conservative	Jamie Lane	1,458	60.3	
Labour	Geoffrey Hrebert	699	28.9	
Liberal Democrats	David Garlick	260	10.8	
Turnout		2,462	72.86	
Conservative hold		Swing		

Brookside (1)
Party	Candidate	Votes	%	±%
Labour	Clement Chunga	979	48.4	
Conservative	Irum Choudary	511	25.3	
UKIP	Martin de Rosario	403	19.9	
Liberal Democrats	Michael Fuller	130	6.4	
Turnout		2,039	52.95	
Labour hold		Swing		

Castle (3)
Party	Candidate	Votes	%	±%
Labour	Danielle Stone	2,198	47.9	
Labour	Anamul Haque	1,783		
Labour	Muna Cali	1,753		
Conservative	Christopher Kellett	1,073	23.4	
Conservative	Gregory Lunn	938		
Green	Julie Hawkins	932	20.3	
Conservative	Nahar Begum	919		
Green	Stuart Town	762		
Liberal Democrats	Aktar Hussein	987	8.4	
Turnout		4,436	50.32	
Labour hold		Swing		
Labour hold		Swing		
Labour hold		Swing		

Delapre & Briar Hill (3)
Party	Candidate	Votes	%	±%
Labour	Julie Davenport	1,883	27.8	
Conservative	Graham Walker*	1,676	24.7	
Labour	Victoria Culbard*	1,579		
Conservative	Richard Cullis	1,428		
UKIP	Kate Truax	1,355	20.0	
Labour	Walter Wlodzimierz	1,337		
Conservative	Minesh Kalaria	1,234		
Liberal Democrats	Brendan Glynane	1,132	16.7	
Liberal Democrats	Michael Ford	984		
Liberal Democrats	Nicola Hedges	870		
Northampton - Save Our Public Services	Norman Adams	462	6.8	
BNP	Mark Plowman	266	3.9	
Turnout		5,556	56.03	
Labour hold		Swing		
Conservative hold		Swing		
Labour gain from Liberal Democrats		Swing		

Eastfield (1)
Party	Candidate	Votes	%	±%
Labour	Elizabeth Gowen	794	37.0	
Conservative	Roy Hickey	722	33.6	
UKIP	Colin Bricher	457	21.3	
Green	Anthony Lochmuller	105	4.9	
Liberal Democrats	Farhana Khan	70	3.3	
Turnout		1,388	38.77	
Labour hold		Swing		

East Hunsbury (2)
Party	Candidate	Votes	%	±%
Conservative	Brandon Eldred	3,312	65.1	
Conservative	Philip Larratt	2,636		
Labour	Anne Wishart	1,099	21.6	
Labour	James Wishart	815		
Liberal Democrats	Richard Alexander	676	13.3	
Turnout				
Conservative hold		Swing		
Conservative hold		Swing		

Headlands (1)
Party	Candidate	Votes	%	±%
Labour	Arthur McCutcheon	1,124	51.6	
Conservative	Naz Islam	793	36.4	
Liberal Democrats	Irene Markham	261	12.0	
Turnout		2,233	63.08	
Labour hold		Swing		

Kings Heath (1)
Party	Candidate	Votes	%	±%
Labour	Teresa Eales	709	44.1	
Conservative	Paul Clark	352	24.8	
UKIP	Matthew Jones	381	23.7	
Liberal Democrats	Fern Conroy	117	7.3	
Turnout		1,614	49.85	
Labour gain from Liberal Democrats		Swing		

Kingsley (1)
Party	Candidate	Votes	%	±%
Labour	Catherine Russell	876	36.9	
Conservative	Samuel Rumens	726	30.6	
UKIP	Beverley Mennell	423	17.8	
Liberal Democrats	Marianne Taylor	285	12.0	
Eccentric Party of Great Britain	Lord Bungle	63	2.7	
Turnout		2,388	60.92	
Labour hold		Swing		

Kingsthorpe (1)
Party	Candidate	Votes	%	±%
Liberal Democrats	Sally Beardsworth	924	34.7	
Conservative	Michael O'Connor	776	29.2	
UKIP	Alan Hames	449	16.9	
Labour	Barry Kirkby	410	15.4	
Green	Stephen Miller	101	3.8	
Turnout		2,663	72.23	
Liberal Democrats hold		Swing		

Nene Valley (2)
Party	Candidate	Votes	%	±%
Conservative	Michael Hill	2,444	42.4	
Conservative	Jonathan Nunn	2,102		
UKIP	Michael Jones	1,129	19.6	
Labour	Joseph Atkins	846	14.7	
Labour	Denise O'Hora	807		
Independent	Liam Costello	783	13.6	
Liberal Democrats	John Crake	568	9.8	
Turnout				
Conservative hold		Swing		
Conservative hold		Swing		

New Duston (2)
Party	Candidate	Votes	%	±%
Conservative	Matthew Goldby	2,507	41.4	
Conservative	John Caswell	2,181		
UKIP	Daniel Guild	1,355	22.4	
Labour	Alan Kingston	1,067	17.6	
Labour	Timothy Jeche	727		
Independent	David Huffadine-Smith	425	7.0	
Green	Lian Allen	373	6.2	
Liberal Democrats	Julia Maddison	329	5.4	
Turnout		5,409	69.54	
Conservative hold		Swing		
Conservative hold		Swing		

Obelisk (1)
Party	Candidate	Votes	%	±%
Conservative	Samuel Shaw	532	33.0	
UKIP	Tom Appleyard	454	28.2	
Labour	Paul Joyce	400	24.8	
Independent	Justin Brown	139	8.6	
Liberal Democrats	Trini Crake	86	5.3	
Turnout		1,617	66.74	
Conservative hold		Swing		

Old Duston (2)
Party	Candidate	Votes	%	±%
Conservative	Timothy Hadland	1,985	43.1	
Conservative	Suresh Patel	1,316		
Labour	Christopher Gardner	916	19.9	
UKIP	Dusan Torbica	889	19.3	
Labour	Geraldine Tandoh	841		
Northampton - Save Our Public Services	David Green	552	12.0	
Liberal Democrats	Roger Conroy	268	5.8	
Turnout		4,326	65.59	
Conservative hold		Swing		
Conservative hold		Swing		

Park (1)
Party	Candidate	Votes	%	±%
Conservative	Mary Markham	1,622	58.0	
Labour	Mark Wall	621	22.2	
UKIP	Roger Feist	370	13.2	
Liberal Democrats	Axel Landmann	182	6.5	
Turnout		2,813	76.44	
Conservative hold		Swing		

Parklands (1)
Party	Candidate	Votes	%	±%
Conservative	Michael Hallam	1,527	59.0	
Labour	Mohammed Miah	540	20.9	
UKIP	Karim El-Ayoubi	359	13.9	
Liberal Democrats	Michael Torpy	161	6.2	
Turnout		2,604	70.66	
Conservative hold		Swing		

Phippsville (1)
Party	Candidate	Votes	%	±%
Conservative	Anna King	799	35.4	
Labour	Stephen O'Connor	689	30.5	
UKIP	Mark Unwin	307	13.6	
Green	Marcus Rock	238	10.5	
Liberal Democrats	Pamela Varnsverry	225	10.0	
Turnout		1,713	55.24	
Conservative hold		Swing		

Rectory Farm (1)
Party	Candidate	Votes	%	±%
Conservative	James Hill	814	38.9	
Labour	Glash Uddin	631	30.2	
UKIP	Toni Walker	505	24.1	
Liberal Democrats	Cella Burge	142	6.8	
Turnout		2,117	57.37	
Conservative hold		Swing		

Riverside (1)
Party	Candidate	Votes	%	±%
Conservative	Stephen Hibbert	799	42.0	
Labour	Tipu Rahman	568	29.9	
UKIP	Thomas Harrison	420	22.1	
Liberal Democrats	Richard Arterton	114	6.0	
Turnout		1,912	54.69	
Conservative hold		Swing		

Rushmills (1)
Party	Candidate	Votes	%	±%
Conservative	Penelope Flavell	1,212	52.3	
Labour	Janet Phillips	601	25.9	
UKIP	Max Titmuss	315	13.6	
Liberal Democrats	Paul Schofield	188	8.1	
Turnout				
Conservative hold		Swing		

Semilong (1)
Party	Candidate	Votes	%	±%
Labour	Les Marriott	642	38.2	
Liberal Democrats	Sarah Ukdall	489	29.1	
Conservative	Laura Eldred	301	17.9	
UKIP	Ian Gibbins	247	14.7	
Turnout		1,700	49.42	
Labour hold		Swing		

Spencer (1)
Party	Candidate	Votes	%	±%
Labour	Gareth Eales	866	42.8	
Conservative	Tim Armit	452	22.3	
UKIP	Irene McGowan	428	21.1	
Liberal Democrats	Sadik Chaudhury	279	13.8	
Turnout		2,038	56.67	
Labour hold		Swing		

Spring Park (1)
Party	Candidate	Votes	%	±%
Conservative	Mohammed Rahman	954	35.3	
UKIP	Robin Fruish	691	25.6	
Labour	Philippa Smith	650	24.1	
Liberal Democrats	Michael Beardsworth	251	9.3	
Green	Daniel Kelsey	142	5.3	
BNP	Raymond Beasley	13	0.5	
Turnout		2,716	72.27	
Conservative hold		Swing		

St Davids (1)
Party	Candidate	Votes	%	±%
Labour	Nazim Choudary	708	40.8	
Conservative	Arthur Newbury	478	27.6	
UKIP	Michael Baker	448	25.8	
Liberal Democrats	Martin Taylor	101	5.8	
Turnout		1,747	54.10	
Labour hold		Swing		

St James (1)
Party	Candidate	Votes	%	±%
Labour	Rufia Ashraf	725	39.4	
Liberal Democrats	Jill Hope	454	24.6	
Conservative	Phillip Buchan	382	20.7	
UKIP	David Lewis	281	15.3	
Turnout		1,858	54.58	
Labour hold		Swing		

Sunnyside (1)
Party	Candidate	Votes	%	±%
Conservative	Nilesh Parekh	1,007	52.7	
Labour	Titus Ajayi	546	28.6	
Liberal Democrats	Mary Paterson	358	18.7	
Turnout		1,941	60.54	
Conservative hold		Swing		

Talavera (2)
Party	Candidate	Votes	%	±%
Liberal Democrats	Dennis Meredith	1,368	30.9	
Labour	Janice Duffy	1,342	30.3	
Labour	Andrew Porter	1,106		
UKIP	John Allen	955	21.6	
Liberal Democrats	Veronica Meredith	910		
Conservative	Francesca King	764	17.2	
Conservative	Julie Rolfe	576		
Turnout		4,022	52.45	
Liberal Democrats hold		Swing		
Labour hold		Swing		

Trinity (1)
Party	Candidate	Votes	%	±%
Labour	Jane Birch	515	29.7	
Conservative	Arif Rahman	370	21.3	
Liberal Democrats	Brian Hoare	366	21.1	
UKIP	John Howsam	249	14.4	
Green	Anthony Clarke	234	13.5	
Turnout		1,739	57.51	
Labour hold		Swing		

Upton (2)
Party	Candidate	Votes	%	±%
Conservative	Alan Bottwood	1,755	62.8	
Conservative	Brian Sargeant	1,522		
Labour	Leanne Ward	699	25.0	
Labour	Repon Miah	578		
Liberal Democrats	Daniel Jones	340	12.2	
Turnout		No data	No data	
Conservative hold		Swing		
Conservative hold		Swing		

West Hunsbury (1)
Party	Candidate	Votes	%	±%
Conservative	Brian Oldham	1,666	70.5	
Labour	Alan Smith	478	20.2	
Liberal Democrats	Cerri Glynane	220	9.3	
Turnout		No data	No data	
Conservative hold		Swing		

Westone (1)
Party	Candidate	Votes	%	±%
Conservative	Matthew Lynch	1,318	56.0	
Labour	Toby Birch	722	30.7	
Liberal Democrats	Charles Markham	315	13.4	
Turnout		2,355	67.51	
Conservative hold		Swing		
