= 2003 Northampton Borough Council election =

2003 UK local government election

- 1 May 2003

All 47 seats in the Northampton Borough Council 24 seats needed for a majority
	First party	Second party	Third party
Party	Conservative	Liberal Democrats	Labour
Last election	8	11	28
Seats won	19	17	11
Seat change	▲11	▲6	▼17
Popular vote	33,122	31,199	22,764
Percentage	37.2%	35.0%	25.6%
- Map showing the results of the 2003 Northampton Borough Council elections.
Council control before election
Labour
Council control after election
No overall control

Elections to Northampton Borough Council were held on 1 May 2003. The whole council was up for election and the Labour Party lost overall control of the council to no overall control.

== Election result ==
Northampton local election result 2003
Party	Seats	Gains	Losses	Net gain/loss	Seats %	Votes %	Votes	+/−
Conservative	19			+11	40.4	37.2	33,122	
Liberal Democrats	17			+5	36.2	35.0	31,199	
Labour	11			-15	23.4	25.6	22,764	
Independent	0			-1	0.0	1.0	902	
Green	0			0	0.0	1.0	864	
UKIP	0			0	0.0	0.2	143	
Liberated Party	0			0	0.0	0.1	54	

== Ward results ==
Abington (2)
Party	Candidate	Votes	%	±%
Liberal Democrats	Irene Markham	986		
Liberal Democrats	Brian Hoare	893		
Labour	Trevor Owen	578		
Labour	Vivienne Dams	573		
Conservative	Juliette Ashby	446		
Conservative	Barry Stoker	414		
Turnout		3,890	31.6	

Billing (2)
Party	Candidate	Votes	%	±%
Conservative	David Palethorpe	832		
Conservative	Christopher Malpas	786		
Labour	Jean Lineker	601		
Labour	Trevor Balley	558		
Liberal Democrats	Norma Felstead	283		
Liberal Democrats	Richard Baldwin	275		
Turnout		3,335	28.20	

Boughton Green (3)
Party	Candidate	Votes	%	±%
Liberal Democrats	John Yates	1,647		
Liberal Democrats	David Perkins	1,579		
Liberal Democrats	Maria-Trinidad Crake	1,533		
Conservative	Alan Beal	700		
Conservative	Julie Rolfe	663		
Conservative	Paul Rolfe	643		
Labour	Graham Mason	533		
Labour	Arthur Whitford	513		
Labour	Frances Wire	448		
Turnout		8,260	34.2	

Castle (2)
Party	Candidate	Votes	%	±%
Labour	Lee Barron	626		
Labour	Peter Evans	558		
Conservative	Edward Barham	474		
Conservative	Robert Butler	452		
Liberal Democrats	Lesley Coles	422		
Liberal Democrats	Grant Walsh	385		
Turnout		2,943	22.4	

Delapre (2)
Party	Candidate	Votes	%	±%
Liberal Democrats	Brendan Glynane	1,145		
Liberal Democrats	Michelle Hoare	1,031		
Labour	Charman Kalyan	505		
Labour	Ulric Gravesande	494		
Conservative	Thomas Joyner	431		
Conservative	Michael Lobban	398		
Turnout		4,004	32.8	

East Hunsbury (2)
Party	Candidate	Votes	%	±%
Conservative	Judith Lill	1,149		
Conservative	Philip Larratt	967		
Liberal Democrats	Jill Panebianco	321		
Liberal Democrats	Carl Squires	307		
Labour	Anthony Peach	274		
Labour	David Thorn	229		
Turnout		3,247	25.2	

Eastfield (2)
Party	Candidate	Votes	%	±%
Conservative	David Acock	684		
Conservative	James Robinson	625		
Labour	Debra Boss	580		
Labour	Frank Gear	543		
Liberal Democrats	Brian Dee	472		
Liberal Democrats	Andrew Cheyne	405		
Independent	Benjamin Jacobs	258		
Green	Joan Lochmuller	142		
Turnout		3,709	30.0	

Ecton Brook (2)
Party	Candidate	Votes	%	±%
Conservative	Jamie Lane	647		
Conservative	Mohammed Yousuf Miah	575		
Labour	Idris Davies	400		
Labour	Mary Davies	395		
Liberal Democrats	Leslie Felstead	302		
Liberal Democrats	Kevin Alderton	274		
Turnout		2,593	25.1	

Headlands (2)
Party	Candidate	Votes	%	±%
Liberal Democrats	Charles Markham	1,425		
Liberal Democrats	Marlon Allen-Minney	1,389		
Conservative	Graham Hawker	731		
Conservative	Philip West	686		
Labour	Pamela Dixon	442		
Labour	Timothy Hart	414		
Turnout		5,087	40.8	

Kingsley (2)
Party	Candidate	Votes	%	±%
Liberal Democrats	Marianne Taylor	1,356		
Liberal Democrats	Andrew Simpson	1,340		
Labour	Dennis Hilliard	498		
Labour	Anthea Mitchell	446		
Conservative	Richard Booker	441		
Conservative	Gary Austin	441		
Green	Anthony Upton	194		
Turnout		4,716	34.1	

Kingsthorpe (2)
Party	Candidate	Votes	%	±%
Liberal Democrats	Sally Beardsworth	1,523		
Liberal Democrats	Richard Church	1,444		
Conservative	Laurice Percival	367		
Conservative	Alan Tebbutt	333		
Labour	Philippa Smith	232		
Labour	Tadzio Dobraszcyk	226		
Turnout		4,125	37.0	

Lumbertubs (2)
Party	Candidate	Votes	%	±%
Labour	Lee Mason	524		
Labour	Margaret Pritchard	523		
Conservative	Dominick Browne	398		
Conservative	Barbara Douglas	379		
Liberal Democrats	David Lovesy	294		
Liberal Democrats	Philip Oakman	266		
Turnout		2,375	21.2	

Nene Valley (2)
Party	Candidate	Votes	%	±%
Conservative	Michael Hill	1,397		
Conservative	Colin Lill	1,394		
Labour	Michael Jones	495		
Labour	Ruqla Sansom	438		
Liberal Democrats	Matthew Nobles	396		
Liberal Democrats	Suzanne Battison	383		
Green	Evelyn Lander	180		
Turnout		4,683	33.3	

New Duston (2)
Party	Candidate	Votes	%	±%
Conservative	John Caswell	1,178		
Conservative	Stephen Stewart	1,163		
Labour	John Jelley	695		
Labour	Francis Lilley	583		
Independent	David Huffadine-Smith	386		
Liberal Democrats	Philippa Swain	267		
Liberal Democrats	Martin Taylor	214		
Turnout		4,486	36.2	

Old Duston (2)
Party	Candidate	Votes	%	±%
Conservative	Elizabeth Tavener	1,300		
Conservative	Donald Edwards	1,282		
Labour	Patricia Ford	714		
Labour	Alan Kingston	700		
Liberal Democrats	Graham Lewis	336		
Liberal Democrats	David Garfirth	328		
Turnout		4,660	38.5	

Parklands (2)
Party	Candidate	Votes	%	±%
Conservative	William Massey	1,187		
Conservative	Brandon Eldred	1,110		
Labour	Kenneth Dowsett	622		
Labour	Iftikhar Choudary	528		
Liberal Democrats	Michael Beardsworth	420		
Liberal Democrats	Sheila Edwards	393		
Green	Anthony Lochmuller	141		
Turnout		4,401	38.5	

Spencer (2)
Party	Candidate	Votes	%	±%
Labour	Paul Concannon	628		
Labour	Anjona Roy	567		
Conservative	Christopher Kelly	448		
Conservative	Peter Jones	415		
Liberal Democrats	Shane Crick	369		
Liberal Democrats	Katharine Abu	319		
Turnout		2,746	23.2	

St. Crispin (2)
Party	Candidate	Votes	%	±%
Labour	Arthur McCutcheon	506		
Conservative	Penelope Flavell	492		
Conservative	Lee Dorey	485		
Labour	Winstone Strachan	457		
Liberal Democrats	Harry Bowden	288		
Liberal Democrats	Russell Ellis	270		
Green	Carol Alexander	207		
Liberated Party	Tina Harvey	54		
Turnout		2,759	21.8	

St. David (2)
Party	Candidate	Votes	%	±%
Liberal Democrats	Jane Hollis	585		
Liberal Democrats	Anthony Woods	522		
Labour	John Gardner	442		
Labour	Nova Keown	395		
Conservative	John A Cartwright	166		
Conservative	John G Cartwright	163		
Independent	Raoul Perry	146		
Independent	Peter Robinson	112		
UKIP	Michael Papworth	70		
Turnout		2,601	24.1	

St. James (2)
Party	Candidate	Votes	%	±%
Labour	Leslie Marriott	686		
Labour	Terence Wire	670		
Conservative	Ian McCann	668		
Conservative	Angela Wright	590		
Liberal Democrats	Ian Vaughan	438		
Liberal Democrats	Cecilie Wayman	414		
Turnout		3,466	28.5	

Thorplands (2)
Party	Candidate	Votes	%	±%
Labour	Leslie Patterson	454		
Labour	Michael Boss	444		
Conservative	Maureen Hill	286		
Conservative	Jonathan Nunn	265		
Liberal Democrats	Eva Down	257		
Liberal Democrats	Gerald Lamb	254		
Turnout		1,960	20.6	

West Hunsbury (2)
Party	Candidate	Votes	%	±%
Liberal Democrats	Jill Hope	1,225		
Liberal Democrats	Richard Matthews	1,182		
Conservative	Rodney Sellers	604		
Conservative	Barry Dearsley	595		
Labour	Ghulam Chowdhury	150		
Labour	Simon Draper	124		
UKIP	Derek Clark	73		
Turnout		3,953	37.9	

Weston (2)
Party	Candidate	Votes	%	±%
Conservative	Timothy Hadland	1,660		
Conservative	Jane Duncan	1,612		
Liberal Democrats	David Garlick	548		
Liberal Democrats	James Cramp	494		
Labour	Clare Pike	393		
Labour	Anthony Deasy	360		
Turnout		5,067	38.5	
