= List of schools in West Northamptonshire =

This is a list of schools in West Northamptonshire, a unitary authority in the English county of Northamptonshire.

== State-funded schools ==
=== Primary schools ===
- Abbey CE Academy, Daventry
- The Abbey Primary School, Northampton
- Abington Vale Primary School, Northampton
- All Saints CE Primary School, Northampton
- The Arbours Primary Academy, Northampton
- Ashby Fields Primary School, Daventry
- Ashton CE Primary School, Ashton
- Badby School, Badby
- Barby CE Primary School, Barby
- Barry Primary School, Northampton
- Blackthorn Primary School, Northampton
- Blakesley CE Primary School, Blakesley
- The Bliss Charity School, Nether Heyford
- Blisworth Community Primary School, Blisworth
- Boddington CE Primary School, Upper Boddington
- Boothville Primary School, Northampton
- Boughton Primary School, Boughton
- Bracken Leas Primary School, Brackley
- Brackley CE Junior School, Brackley
- The Bramptons Primary School, Chapel Brampton
- Braunston CE Primary School, Braunston
- Briar Hill Primary School, Northampton
- Bridgewater Primary School, Northampton
- Brington Primary School, Little Brington
- Brixworth CE Primary School, Brixworth
- Buckton Fields Primary School, Northampton
- Bugbrooke Community Primary School, Bugbrooke
- Byfield School, Byfeild
- Caroline Chisholm School, Northampton
- Castle Academy, Northampton
- Cedar Road Primary School, Northampton
- Chacombe CE Primary Academy, Chacombe
- Chiltern Primary School, Northampton
- Chipping Warden Primary Academy, Chipping Warden
- Clipston Endowed Primary School, Clipston
- Cogenhoe Primary School, Cogenhoe
- Collingtree CE Primary School, Collingtree
- Cosgrove Village Primary School, Cosgrove
- Crick Primary School, Crick
- Croughton All Saints CE Primary School, Croughton
- Culworth CE Primary Academy, Culworth
- Danetre and Southbrook Learning Village, Daventry
- Deanshanger Primary School, Deanshanger
- Delapre Primary School, Northampton
- Denton Primary School, Denton
- Duston Eldean Primary School, Duston
- The Duston School, Duston
- Earl Spencer Primary School, Northampton
- East Haddon CE Primary School, East Haddon
- East Hunsbury Primary School, Northampton
- Eastfield Academy, Northampton
- Ecton Brook Primary School, Northampton
- Falconer's Hill Academy, Daventry
- Falconer's Hill Infant School, Daventry
- Farthinghoe Primary School, Farthinghoe
- Flore CE Primary School, Flore
- Gayton CE Primary School, Gayton
- The Good Shepard RC Primary School, Northampton
- The Grange School, Daventry
- Greatworth Primary School, Greatworth
- Green Oaks Primary Academy, Northampton
- Greens Norton CE Primary School, Greens Norton
- Guilsborough CE Primary School, Guilsborough
- Hackleton CE Primary School, Hackleton
- Hardingstone Academy, Northampton
- Harlestone Primary School, Lower Harlestone
- Harpole Primary School, Harpole
- Hartwell Primary School, Hartwell
- Headlands Primary School, Northampton
- Helmdon Primary School, Helmdon
- Hopping Hill Primary School, Northampton
- Hunsbury Park Primary School, Northampton
- John Hellins Primary School, Potterspury
- Kilsby CE Primary School, Kilsby
- Kings Heath Primary Academy, Northampton
- Kings Sutton Primary Academy, King's Sutton
- Kingsley Primary School, Northampton
- Kingsthorpe Grove Primary School, Northampton
- Kingsthorpe Village Primary School, Kingsthorpe
- Kislingbury Primary School, Kislingbury
- Lings Primary School, Northampton
- Little Houghton CE Primary, Little Houghton
- Long Buckby Infant School, Long Buckby
- Long Buckby Junior School, Long Buckby
- Lumbertubs Primary School, Northampton
- Lyncrest Primary School, Northampton
- Maidwell Primary School, Maidwell
- Malcolm Arnold Preparatory School, Northampton
- Marie Weller Primary School, Towcester
- Middleton Cheney Primary Academy, Middleton Cheney
- Millway Primary School, Northampton
- Milton Parochial Primary School, Milton Malsor
- Monksmoor Park CE Primary School, Daventry
- Moulton Primary School, Moulton
- Naseby CE Primary Academy, Naseby
- Newbottle and Charlton CE Primary School, Charlton
- Newnham Primary School, Newnham
- Nicholas Hawksmoor Primary School, Towcester
- Northampton International Academy, Northampton
- Old Stratford Primary School, Old Stratford
- Overstone Primary School, Overstone
- Parklands Primary School, Northampton
- Pattishall CE Primary School, Astcote
- Paulerspury CE Primary School, Paulerspury
- Pineham Barns Primary School, Pineham Village
- Pitsford Primary School, Pitsford
- Preston Hedges Primary School, Northampton
- Queen Eleanor Primary Academy, Northampton
- The Radstone Primary School, Brackley
- Rectory Farm Primary School, Northampton
- Roade Primary School, Roade
- Rothersthorpe CE Primary School, Rothersthorpe
- St Andrew's CE Primary School, Northampton
- St Gregory's RC Primary School, Northampton
- St James CE Primary School, Northampton
- St James Infant School, Daventry
- St Loys CE Primary School, Weedon Lois
- St Luke's CE Primary School, Northampton
- St Mary's RC Primary School, Aston le Walls
- St Mary's RC Primary School, Northampton
- Silverstone CE Primary School, Silverstone
- Simon de Senlis Primary School, Northampton
- Southfield Primary School, Brackley
- Spratton CE Primary School, Spratton
- Spring Lane Primary School, Northampton
- Standens Barn Primary School, Northampton
- Staverton CE Primary School, Staverton
- Stimpson Avenue Academy, Northampton
- Stoke Bruerne CE Primary School, Stoke Bruerne
- Sunnyside Primary Academy, Northampton
- Syresham St James CE Primary School, Syresham
- Thorpland Primary School, Northampton
- Tiffield CE Primary School, Tiffield
- Towcester CE Primary School, Towcester
- Upton Meadows Primary School, Upton
- Vernon Terrace Primary School, Northampton
- Walgrave Primary School, Walgrave
- Waynflete Infant's School, Brackley
- Weedon Bec Primary School, Weedon Bec
- Welford Sibbertoft and Sulby Endowed School, Welford
- Welton CE Academy, Welton
- West Haddon Endowed CE Primary School, Northampton
- Weston Favell CE Primary School, Northampton
- Whitehills Primary School, Northampton
- Whittlebury CE Primary School, Towcester
- Woodford Halse CE Primary Academy, Daventry
- Woodland View Primary School, Northampton
- Woodvale Primary Academy, Northampton
- Wootton Park School, Northampton
- Wootton Primary Academy, Wootton
- Yardley Gobion CE Primary School, Yardley Gobion
- Yardley Hastings Primary School, Yardley Hastings
- Yelvertoft Primary School, Yelvertoft

=== Secondary schools ===
- Abbeyfield School, Northampton
- Campion School, Bugbrooke
- Caroline Chisholm School, Northampton
- Chenderit School, Middleton Cheney
- Danetre and Southbrook Learning Village, Daventry
- The Duston School, Duston
- Elizabeth Woodville School, Deanshanger and Roade
- Guilsborough Academy, Guilsborough
- Kingsthorpe College, Northampton
- Magdalen College School, Brackley
- Malcolm Arnold Academy, Northampton
- Moulton School and Science College, Moulton
- Northampton Academy, Northampton
- Northampton International Academy, Northampton
- Northampton School, Northampton
- Northampton School for Boys, Northampton
- Northampton School for Girls, Northampton
- The Parker E-ACT Academy, Daventry
- Silverstone University Technical College, Silverstone
- Sponne School, Towcester
- Thomas Becket Catholic School, Northampton
- Weston Favell Academy, Northampton
- Wootton Park School, Northampton

=== Special and alternative schools ===
- The Cambian School, Northampton
- Billing Brook Special School, Northampton
- The CE Academy, Northampton
- Daventry Hill School, Daventry
- Fairfields School, Northampton
- The Gateway School, Tiffield
- Greenfields Specialist School for Communication, Northampton
- Hospital and Outreach Education, Northampton
- Kings Meadow School, Northampton
- Northgate School Arts College, Northampton
- Purple Oaks Academy, Northampton
- The Spires Academy, Northampton

=== Further education ===
- Moulton College
- Northampton College

== Independent schools ==
=== Primary and preparatory schools ===
- Akeley Wood Junior School, Wicken
- Carrdus School, Overthorpe
- Maidwell Hall School, Maidwell (closed 2025)
- OneSchool Global UK, Northampton
- Spratton Hall School, Spratton
- Winchester House School, Brackley

=== Senior and all-through schools ===
- Bosworth Independent College, Northampton
- Northampton High School, Hardingstone
- Overstone Park School, Overstone
- Pitsford School, Pitsford
- Quinton House School, Upton
- St Andrew's College, Northampton

=== Special and alternative schools ===
- Cambian Northampton School, Northampton
- Education & Youth Services, Northampton
- Include Northampton, Northampton
- On Track Education Centre Northants, Northampton
- On Track Education Silverstone, Silverstone
- Potterspury Lodge School, Towcester
- Progress Schools, Northampton
