= Northampton (civil parish) =

Coordinates: 52.2374°N 0.8946°W

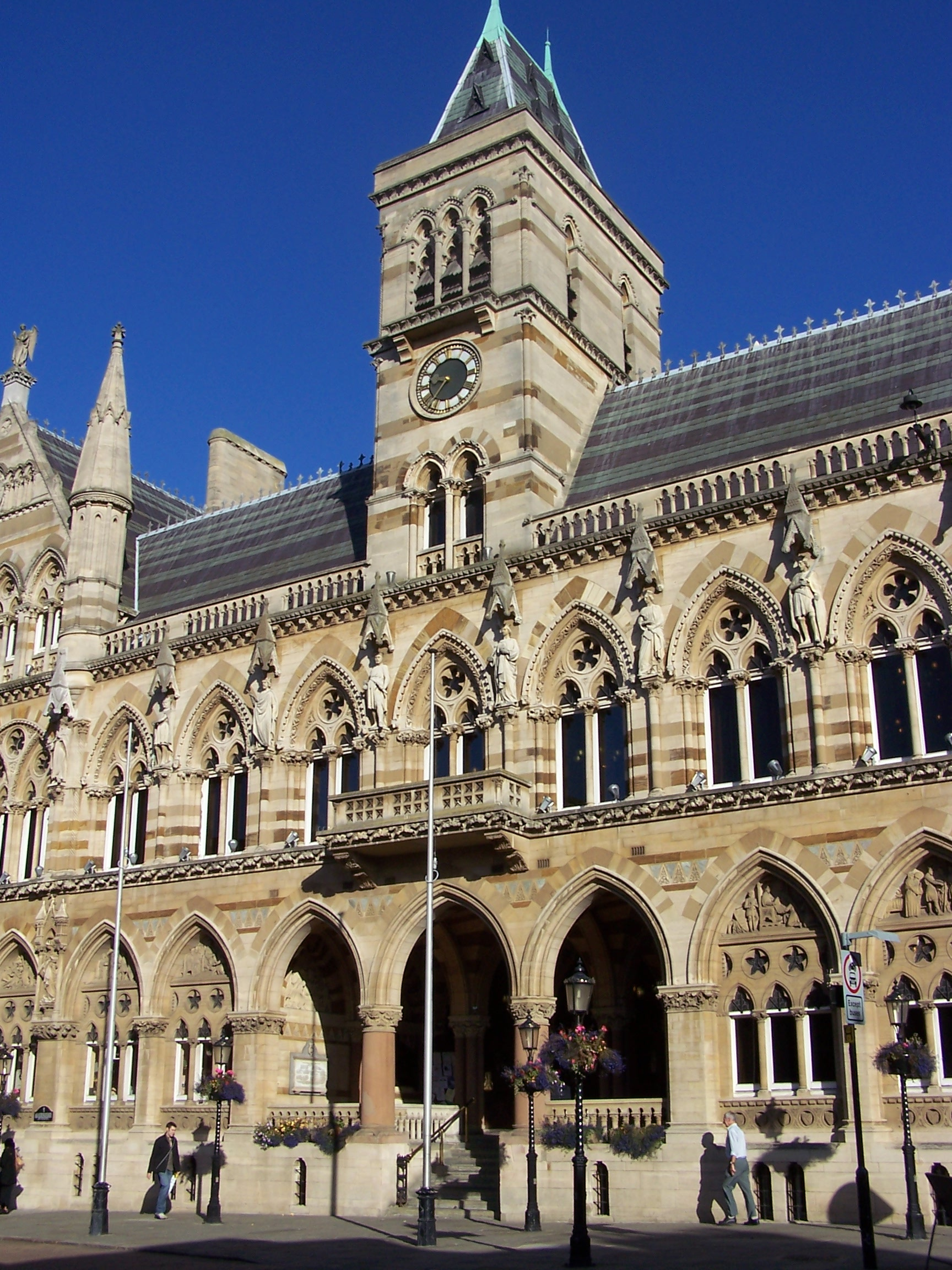
- Northampton Guildhall

- Location within Northamptonshire
- Area: 38.79 km^{2} (14.98 sq mi)
- Population: 137,387 (2021 census)
  - Density: 3,542/km^{2} (9,170/sq mi)
- Civil parish: Northampton
- Unitary authority: West Northamptonshire
- Ceremonial county: Northamptonshire
- Region: East Midlands
- Country: England
- Sovereign state: United Kingdom
- Police: Northamptonshire
- Fire: Northamptonshire
- Ambulance: East Midlands

Map of Northampton, shaded areas indicate Northampton urban area but other parish

Northampton is a civil parish covering the greater part of the urban area of the town of Northampton, including the town centre, in the West Northamptonshire district, in the ceremonial county of Northamptonshire, England. In 2021 the parish had an area of 38.79 square kilometres (14.98 sq mi), and a population of 137,387, making it one of the most populous civil parish in England.

== History ==
The governing body is Northampton Town Council, which is one of the largest parish level authority in England. The current parish was formed on 1 April 2020 with the council becoming fully functioning a year later, concurrently with local government changes in Northamptonshire. When the parish was formed it was the largest in England by population. In 2026 the parishes of Bournemouth and Poole were formed, the pre 2019 districts of Bournemouth and Poole had a 2015 estimated population of 194,500 and 150,600 however as well as boundary changes the pre 2019 Bournemouth area also has Throop and Holdenhurst and the pre 2019 Poole area also has Broadstone.

The previous parish was formed on 1 April 1909 from St Giles, St Sepulchre, Priory of St Andrew, All Saints and St Peter, being an urban parish of the County Borough of Northampton it had no council or meeting. On 1 April 1974 the parish was abolished, no successor parish was formed so it became unparished with the county borough also abolished the central part of the town had no council.

== Other parishes covering Northampton urban area ==
As well as the parish of Northampton, there are 12 other civil parishes in the Northampton urban area, ten were pre-existing, and two (Kingsthorpe and Far Cotton and Delapre) were created concurrently with the town council (these 3 were previously unparished), these are:

- Billing
- Duston
- Collingtree
- East Hunsbury
- Far Cotton and Delapre
- Great Houghton
- Hardingstone
- Hunsbury Meadows
- Kingsthorpe
- Upton
- West Hunsbury
- Wootton
