= West Hunsbury =

Housing estate in Northampton, England

Coordinates: 52.217°N 0.924000°W

West Hunsbury (old name: Shelfleys)
- Location within Northamptonshire
- Population: 4,751 (United Kingdom ONS 2013) Data for West Hunsbury ward, Northampton Borough Council
- OS grid reference: SP725585
  - London: 67 miles (108 km)
- Civil parish: West Hunsbury
- Unitary authority: West Northamptonshire
- Ceremonial county: Northamptonshire
- Region: East Midlands
- Country: England
- Sovereign state: United Kingdom
- Post town: NORTHAMPTON
- Postcode district: NN4
- Dialling code: 01604
- Police: Northamptonshire
- Fire: Northamptonshire
- Ambulance: East Midlands
- UK Parliament: South Northamptonshire

West Hunsbury is a housing estate in the south of Northampton, England, situated around 2 miles (3 km) away from the town centre, and 0.5 miles (1 km) away from the M1 motorway via junction 15A. It is part of the Hunsbury residential area, which also constitutes East Hunsbury east of Towcester Road. Shelfleys is an earlier name for the area and still appears on signs, maps and bus destination indicators. However Hunsbury is an old name and Hunsbury Hill was an Iron Age hill fort, also known as Danes Camp. Iron ore was formerly quarried in the area. This had begun by 1873 and an ironworks called Hunsbury Ironworks was in the course of being built in that year. The quarries were worked by several companies and individual owners, two of which companies used the name "Hunsbury" in their titles. The area was part of the Borough of Northampton. The area was developed in the 1970s, 1980s, 1990s and 2000s as part of the expansion of Northampton.

== Iron industry ==
The industry operated in the area from the early 1870s until 1921. The Hunsbury Ironworks was being built in 1873. The works were by the canal and the Northampton to Blisworth railway, south of Duston Mill and west of Briar Hill Farm. The works smelted local ore as well as ore from elsewhere in southern Northamptonshire. At first the quarries were next to the works but later quarries were in the area of Hunsbury Hill Camp and further east ceasing in 1920. The quarries were connected to the works by a 3-foot eight inch gauge tramway. At first this was worked by a combination of gravity and horses, according to whether the gradient was in favour of the trains of wagons. In 1912 three steam locomotives were obtained to work these trains. The actual quarrying was done by hand with a pick and shovel. The quarrying took place in fIve areas. The first was next to the works before 1877. The second was to the north west of Hunsbury Hill Camp (Danes Camp), between 1877 and 1882. The third area was to the east of this, to the north of the Camp and south of Rothersthorpe Road between 1882 and 1889 extending over the top of the main railway tunnel. The eastern part of this quarry was served by another tramway running to the Blisworth line east of Briar Hill Farm, where a tipping dock would have been necessary. The fourth area was to the south of the Camp from 1882 to 1920 extending into what is now East Hunsbury, over top of the railway tunnel and on both sides of the railway south of the tunnel portal This quarry went as far as what was then Towcester Road (now Hill Farm Rise.) The last area quarried was to the east of this road between 1912 and 1920.

The works ceased production on 28 January 1921. The owner, Pickering Phipps, proposed to reopen it and the last quarry but died before he could do this. The works and quarrying lease were bought by Richard Thomas & Co Ltd in 1935 but their proposal to reopen the works and quarries was not carried out either.

The quarries were not landscaped after abandonment and for many years the quarry faces and uneven ground created by the quarrying were clearly visible. However following the building of the housing estate from 1970 onwards the only visible remains are now in Hunsbury Hill Park and in what is now East Hunsbury. The industry was commemorated by the name of the Ironstone Pub (now closed) and a street name, Ironstone Lane.

== Demographics ==
The 2001 census shows a population of 7,468 of which 3,727 were male and 3,741 female, in 3,005 households. However, note that this data applies to the West Hunsbury ward of the former Northampton Borough Council which includes areas outside of West Hunsbury proper, as the areas are not parished – see the notes on Governance below.

== Facilities ==
=== Community ===
There is a modern church, St Benedict's, Church of England, and shops including a small supermarket, estate agents, post office, pharmacy, optician. The same site also has a health centre. In the car park of Hunsbury Hill Country Park there is now a small café called "The Drover's Return" named after the ancient Drover's Pathway which leads through the park.

Opposite the shop area is an area of sheltered housing grouped around a small community centre used for social events and meetings.

The area shares many facilities with East Hunsbury especially at the junction of the old Towcester road and Mereway ring road. There is also the Danes Camp leisure centre and swimming pool. Collingtree Park Golf Course is in Windingbrooke Lane and accessible from Rowtree Road in East Hunsbury.

The Hunsbury Hill Centre is a collection of old farm buildings built about 1770 overlooking the River Nene valley to the north. The main farmhouse is a Grade II listed building. The centre is for community use and has three separate function rooms surrounding an octagonal courtyard which can host a variety of events. The main hall seats up to 120 and there is ample free parking in the pleasant and peaceful grounds. The centre is owned by Northamptonshire ACRE, "Action with Communities in Rural England" an independent charitable organisation, working with rural communities in Northamptonshire. Income generated from the centre goes to support the charity's running costs.

=== Parks ===
The site of an Iron Age hill fort, dating from ca. 400BC, the area is now part of Hunsbury Hill Country Park. The area around was also extensively quarried for ironstone between 1880 and 1921 and there is a section of railway used for demonstration purposes together with a museum. Another park at the bottom of the hill near the motorway separates the housing development from The Counties Crematorium.

=== Schools ===
There is a primary school in the area: Hunsbury Park Primary School. The area is in the catchment of Abbeyfield School located on the north side of Mere Way dual carriageway which is also a business and enterprise college. The school was previously Mereway Upper School and, prior to 2008, Mereway Performing Arts College.

Several village schools south of the town are popular including the primary schools at Milton Malsor, Gayton, Rothersthorpe, Blisworth and Collingtree. Many children of secondary age use Campion School in Bugbrooke and Caroline Chisholm School in nearby Wootton.

== Governance ==
After a Community Governance Review in 2012 a new civil parish council was formed on 1 April 2013 with the first elections to the new council on 2 May 2013.

West Hunsbury originally spanned two parishes: Hardingstone, north of Green Lane and Wootton to the south and east, but was de-parished in a boundary review during the 1980s. From 1999 to the 2011 borough elections West Hunsbury form part of a larger borough ward also called West Hunsbury which elected two borough councillors both Liberal Democrat. However, note that the ward also includes housing estates outside of West Hunsbury proper, namely Camp Hill, Hunsbury Meadows, Upton Parish (includes St Crispins Estate and other areas south of Berrywood Road such as Camelot Way) and a small part of East Hunsbury. From 2011, when boundary changes made West Hunsbury (and Camp Hill) into its own Borough Ward of Northampton Borough Council electing one member, most of the remaining area moving to the two-member Upton ward. In 2013, West Hunsbury Parish Council was formed with 8 elected members and covered the same area as the borough ward.

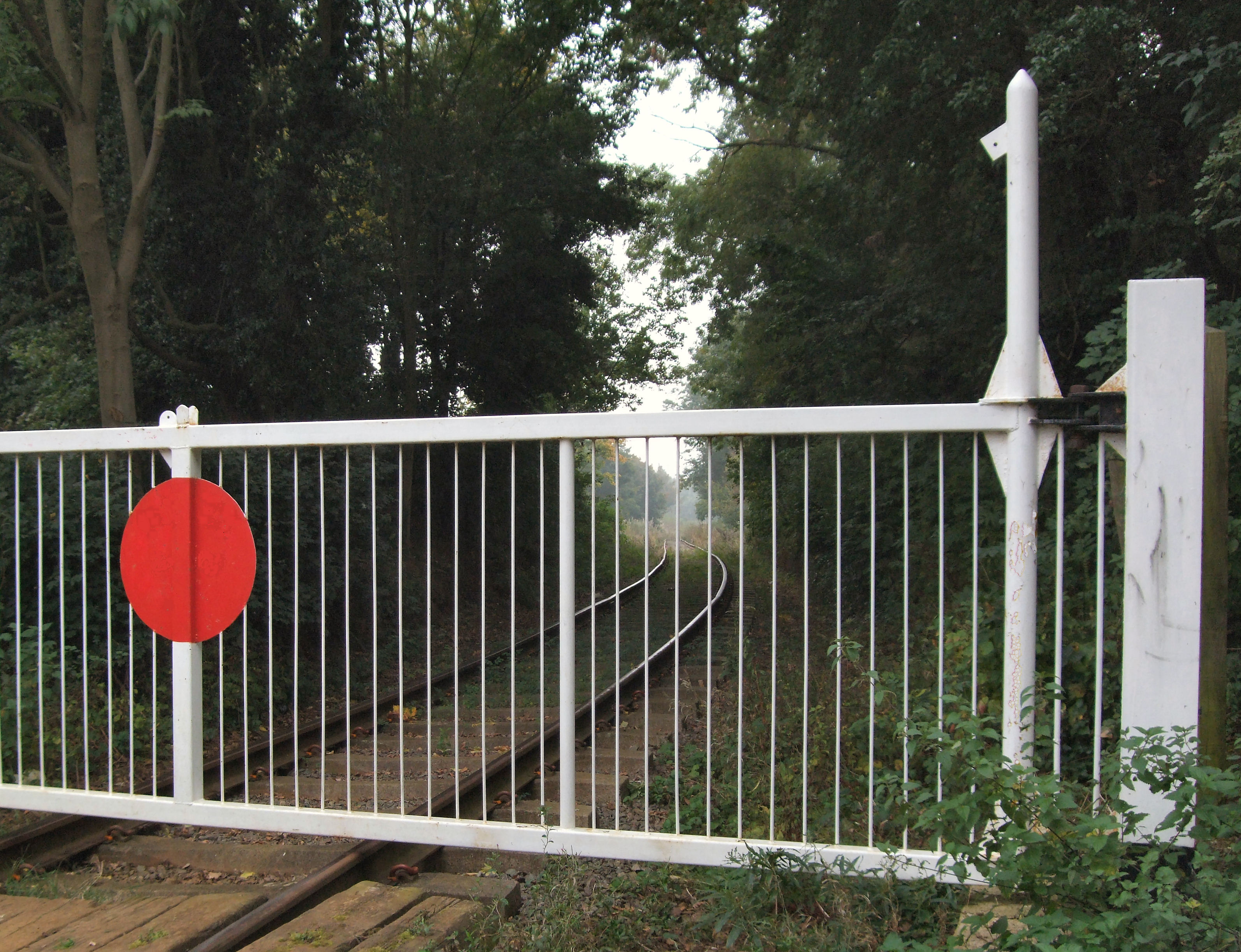
Part of the Northamptonshire Ironstone Railway Trust's preserved ironstone railway near Danes Camp

. As of 2021, the neighbourhood forms part of the unitary authority area of West Northamptonshire

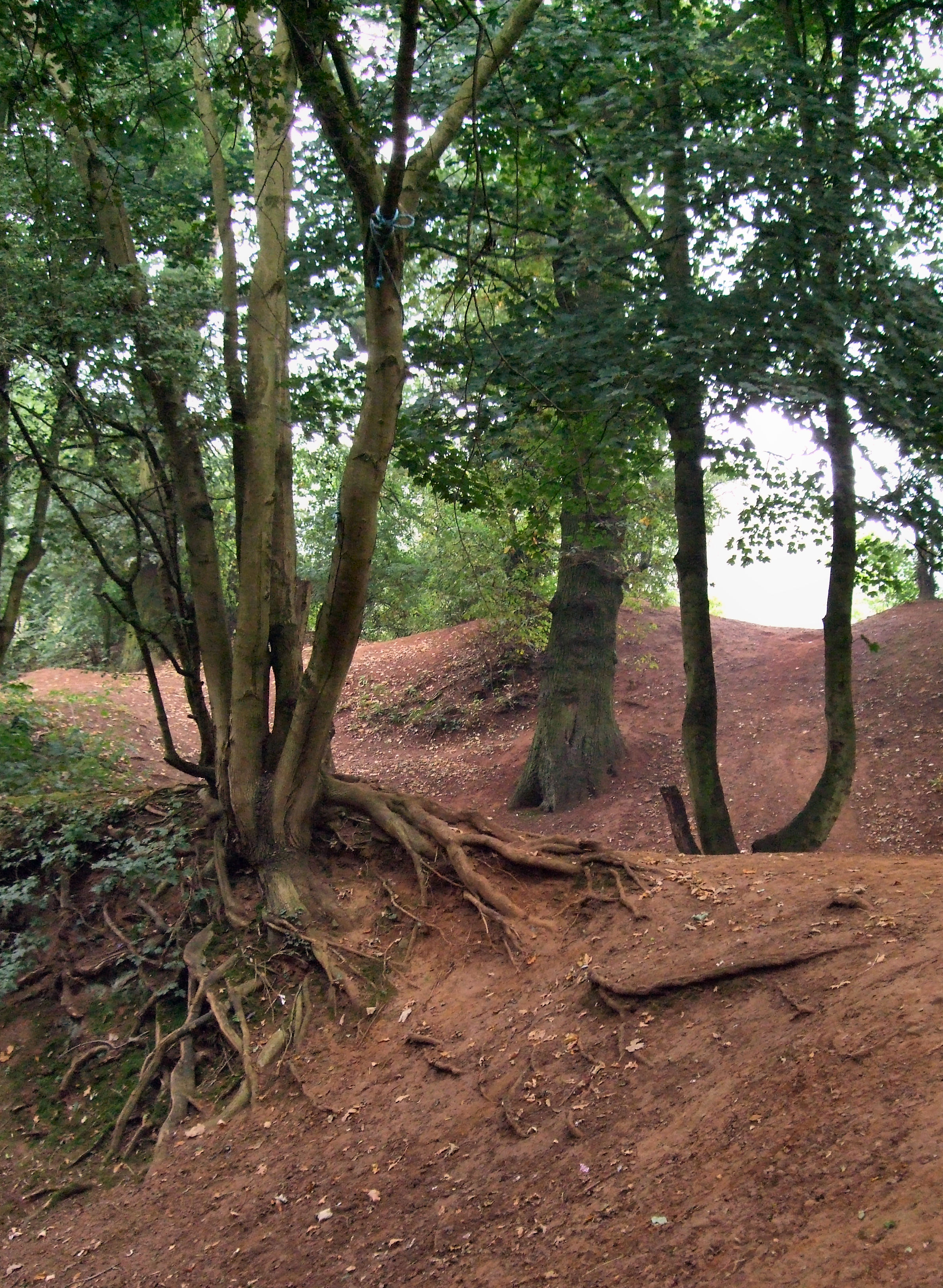
Earthworks at Danes Camp Iron Age hill fort

West Hunsbury was part of the Northampton South constituency, Conservative. From the 2010 general election it was transferred to the new seat of South Northamptonshire, also considered a 'safe' Conservative seat.
