= Northampton Borough Council =

Former non-metropolitan district in England

Type
- Type: Non-metropolitan district council of Northampton

History
- Succeeded by: West Northamptonshire Council; Northampton Town Council

Elections
- Last election: 7 May 2015

Meeting place
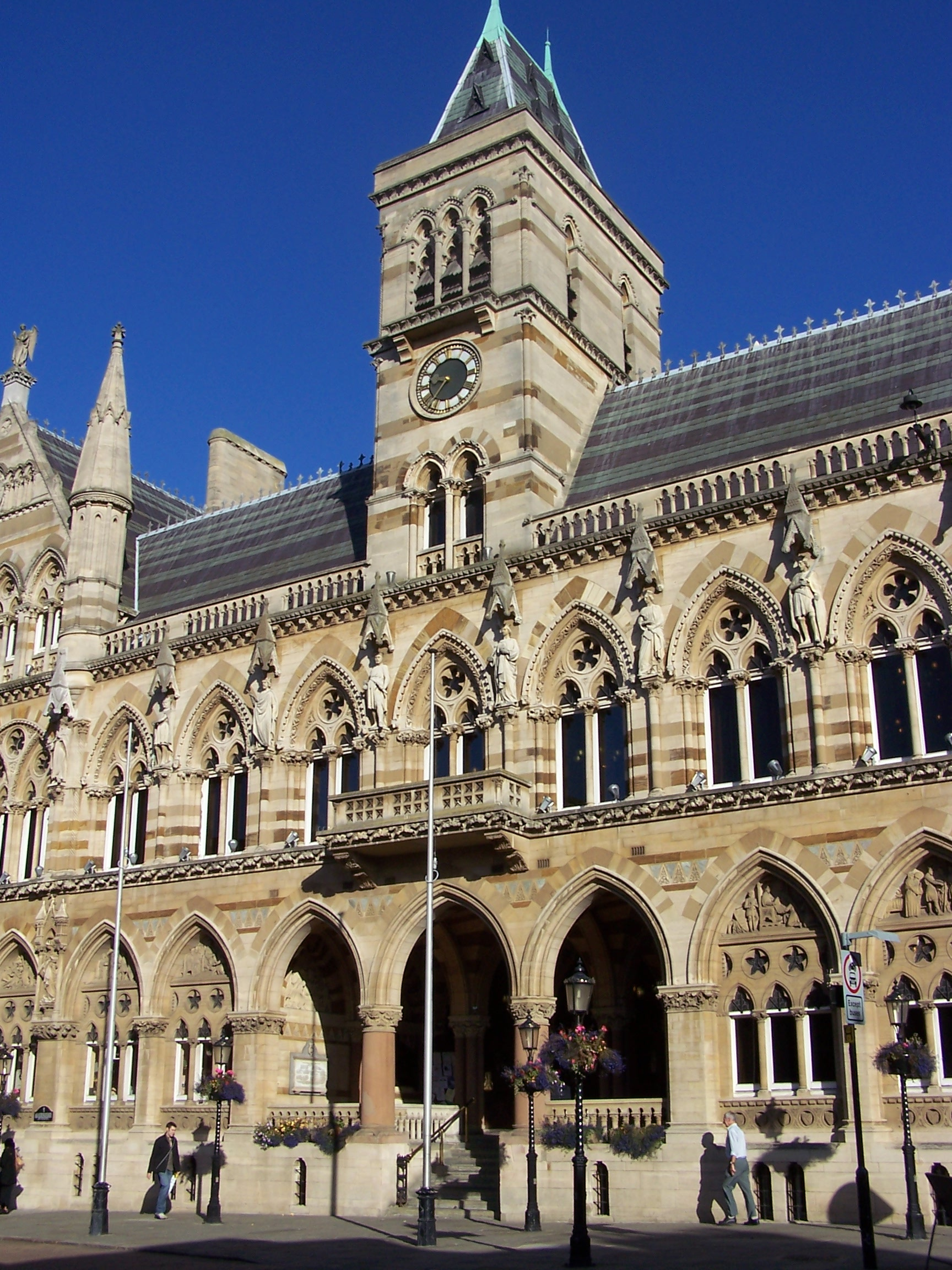
- Guildhall, St Giles Square, Northampton

Website
- www.northampton.gov.uk

Northampton Borough Council was the local authority for Northampton in Northamptonshire, England. Northampton had a council from medieval times, which was reformed on numerous occasions. From 1974 until its abolition in 2021, the council was a non-metropolitan district council. The council was based at Northampton Guildhall. In 2021 the council was abolished and succeeded by West Northamptonshire Council, a unitary authority, and Northampton Town Council, a parish council.

== History ==
Northampton was an ancient borough. It was granted its first municipal charter in 1189 by Richard I. The borough was given the right to appoint a mayor in 1215 by King John. The borough was reformed to become a municipal borough in 1836 under the Municipal Corporations Act 1835, which standardised how most boroughs operated across the country. It was then governed by a body formally called the "Mayor, Aldermen and Burgesses of the Borough of Northampton", which was generally known as the corporation, town council, or borough council.

When elected county councils were established in 1889 under the Local Government Act 1888, Northampton was considered large enough for its existing borough council to provide county-level functions, and so it was made a county borough, independent from Northamptonshire County Council. It comprised 6 wards from 1898, 9 wards from 1900 and 12 wards from 1911. The borough boundaries were enlarged several times as the town grew.

County boroughs, including Northampton, were abolished in 1974 under the Local Government Act 1972. A non-metropolitan district called Northampton was created instead, subordinate to Northamptonshire County Council. The new district covered the area of the former county borough plus adjoining areas within the designated area for the New Town expansion of Northampton. The district was granted borough status from its creation, allowing the council to take the name Northampton Borough Council and letting the chair of the council take the title of mayor, continuing Northampton's series of mayors dating back to 1215.

Many former county boroughs regained their independence from county councils during local government reforms in the 1990s by being made unitary authorities. Northampton Borough Council also sought to be made a unitary authority at that time, but was unsuccessful. It was decided that "the separation of Northampton from its county would have a significant and detrimental effect."

In March 2018, an independent report commissioned by the Secretary of State for Housing, Communities and Local Government, proposed structural changes to local government in Northamptonshire. These proposals saw the existing county council and district councils abolished and two new unitary authorities created in their place. One authority would consist of the existing districts of Daventry, Northampton and South Northamptonshire and the other authority would consist of Corby, East Northamptonshire, Kettering and Wellingborough districts.

In 2021 the council was abolished and succeeded by West Northamptonshire Council, a unitary authority, and Northampton Town Council, a parish council. This was done, in part, due to failing a corruption probe into the disappearance of over £10 million.

Civil parishes of Northampton District upon its formation in 1974

At its formation in 1974 the district consisted of six parishes and one large unparished area, as indicated by the map. The following significant changes to civil parishes took place during the district's history:

- 1990: Wootton renamed Wootton and East Hunsbury.
- 1 April 1991: Duston created out of part of the Northampton unparished area.
- 1 April 2013: Hunsbury Meadows and West Hunsbury created out of the Northampton unparished area.
- 1 April 2015: Wootton and East Hunsbury divided into the parishes of East Hunsbury and Wootton, Wootton Fields and Simpson Manor.
- 2 November 2015: Wootton, Wootton Fields and Simpson Manor renamed Wootton.
- 1 April 2020: The Northampton unparished area is divided into the parishes of Far Cotton and Delapre, Kingsthorpe and Northampton.

Civil parishes of Northampton District upon its abolition in 2021

== Political control ==
Political control of the council from the 1974 reforms until the council's abolition in 2021 was as follows:

Party in control	Years
Labour	1974–1976
Conservative	1976–1983
No overall control	1983–1987
Conservative	1987–1991
No overall control	1991–1995
Labour	1995–2003
No overall control	2003–2007
Liberal Democrats	2007–2011
Conservative	2011–2021

=== Leadership ===
The mayor of Northampton was the ceremonial figurehead for the borough council, and tended to be held by a different councillor each year. Political leadership was provided instead by the leader of the council. The leaders from 2000 until the council's abolition in 2021 were:

Councillor	Party	From	To
John Dickie	Labour		May 2000
Keith Davies	Labour	25 May 2000	May 2003
Phil Larratt	Conservative	2003	Jan 2006
Tim Hadland	Conservative	2006	2007
Tony Woods	Liberal Democrats	2007	26 Oct 2009
Brian Hoare	Liberal Democrats	26 Oct 2009	May 2011
David Palethorpe	Conservative	May 2011	26 Oct 2011
David Mackintosh	Conservative	7 Nov 2011	May 2015
Mary Markham	Conservative	May 2015	Oct 2016
Jonathan Nunn	Conservative	Oct 2016	31 Mar 2021

Jonathan Nunn subsequently became the first leader of the replacement West Northamptonshire Council.

== Arms ==
Coat of arms of Northampton Borough Council
Notes Recorded at the 1617 visitation. Escutcheon Gules on a mount Vert a tower triple-towered Argent the portcullis raised Or supported by two lions rampant guardant of the last. Motto Castello Fortior Concordia (Peace Is Stronger Than A Fortress)

== See also ==
- List of mayors of Northampton
- Northamptonshire Credit Union
