= East Hunsbury =

Area of Northampton, England

Coordinates: 52.207333°N 0.900000°W

East Hunsbury (Merefield and Blacky More)
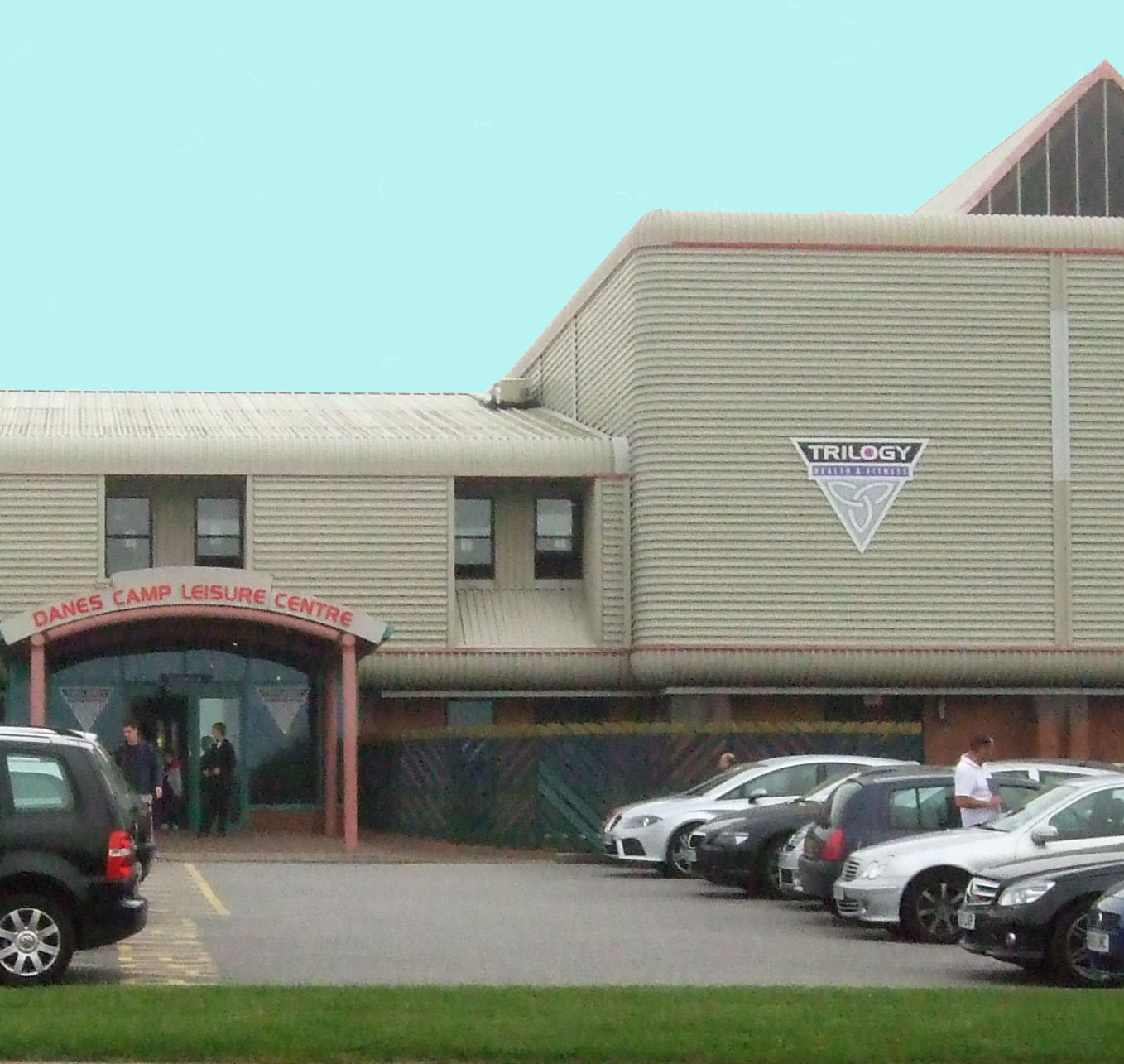
- Danes Camp Leisure Centre, East Hunsbury

- Location within Northamptonshire
- Population: 9,058 (East Hunsbury Northampton Borough Ward, 2001)
- OS grid reference: SP751573
  - London: 66 miles (106 km) SE
- Civil parish: East Hunsbury
- Unitary authority: West Northamptonshire
- Ceremonial county: Northamptonshire
- Region: East Midlands
- Country: England
- Sovereign state: United Kingdom
- Post town: NORTHAMPTON
- Postcode district: NN4
- Dialling code: 01604
- Police: Northamptonshire
- Fire: Northamptonshire
- Ambulance: East Midlands
- UK Parliament: South Northamptonshire

East Hunsbury is a large residential area in the south of Northampton, England, situated around 3 miles (5 km) from the town centre and 1 mile (2 km) from junction 15 of the M1 motorway. For administrative purposes it is part of the unitary authority of West Northamptonshire. It is part of the Hunsbury conglomeration, which also includes West Hunsbury on the west side of Towcester Road. Shelfleys is the original name for the area of Northampton currently referred to as West Hunsbury. The name of West Hunsbury still appears on maps for the district as Shelfleys. Merefield is the corresponding name for East Hunsbury, together with the name "Blacky More" for the eastern part of East Hunsbury. All three names are still on local direction signs in Northampton, although older references are no longer in use by the local people living there. The areas developed in the 1980s and 1990s as part of the expansion of Northampton. The Northampton loop of the West Coast Main Line railway running between Northampton and London Euston runs under East and West Hunsbury via the Hunsbury Hill Tunnel emerging near Hill Farm Rise which follows the original course of Towcester Road prior to the 1980s. Ventilation shafts are visible in the housing estate in Yeoman Meadow. East Hunsbury was awarded ‘Best Large Village’ in 2019 by NorthantsAcre.

== Industry before Housing Development ==
Until the 1890s the East Hunsbury was agricultural land. From 1897 an iron ore quarry to the west expanded into the area south and east of Hunsbury and from 1912 to the area on each side of the cutting at the south end of the railway tunnel.and on the east side of the original course of Towcester Road. The ore was taken to the Hunsbury Ironworks which was by the River Nene south of Duston for smelting. The ore was taken by a 3 ft 8 inch gauge tramway which was horse worked until 1912 when steam locomotives were introduced. Quarrying ceased in 1921. Little was done to landscape the area and the quarries were clearly visible in 1966. There were proposals to begin quarrying again in the 1920s, in 1937 and again in 1952 but nothing came of these. Much of the quarried area has been built on.

== Demographics ==
The 2001 census shows a population of 9,058 of which 4,561 were male and 4,497 female, in 3,616 households.

=== Community ===
There are two smaller retail parks, one at Blacky More with a small supermarket, takeaway fish and chip shop, florists, chemist, hair salon, a public house ("The Collingtree"), community centre and an estate agent. At the other in Merefield, adjacent to the Mereway ring road, there is a larger supermarket open 24 hours, except Sunday, 10:00 to 16:00. It has a coffee shop, optician and a petrol station. Also on the same site is a sandwich shop, estate agent , a restaurant, a card shop and a hair dressers. There is also the Danes Camp Leisure centre and swimming pool . Collingtree Park Golf Course is in Windingbrooke Lane and accessible from Rowtree Road.

East Hunsbury is also home to the Grangewood Park Residents Club, a leisure complex converted from grade II listed farm buildings for the exclusive use of 265 homeowners on the Grangewood Estate (located within 'Merefield' – see above) and their invited guests. The leisure complex includes two licensed bar areas, tennis & squash courts.

=== Schools ===
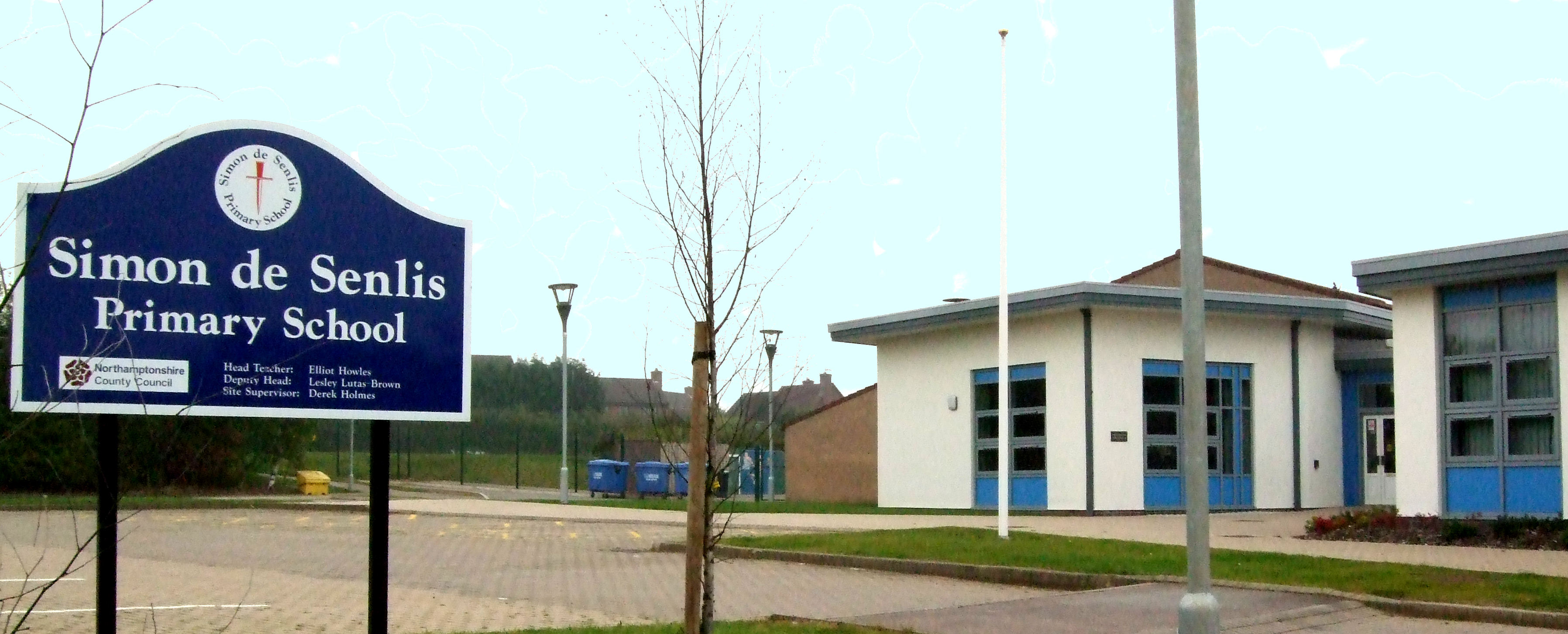
Simon de Senlis Primary School

There are two primary schools in the area: East Hunsbury Primary School and Simon de Senlis Primary School, which was rebuilt in 2006-8, having previously been a Lower School. The re-build was part of the Northampton PFI, the government's Private Funding Initiative, with the partner companies involved being Babcock & Brown Properties, Amey and Galliford Try.

The area is in the catchment of Abbeyfield School, formerly Mereway Upper School and later Community College, located on the north side of Mere Way dual carriageway. It is also the catchment for Wootton Park School which is a newly built primary and secondary school located on the south side of the Mereway dual carriageway. Many children of secondary age in the district go to Campion School in Bugbrooke or Caroline Chisholm School in Wootton, Northamptonshire.

== Governance ==
The area now has its own Parish Council. Until 2015 it was part of Wooton parish. East Hunsbury Parish Council was formed on 1 April 2015. This was part of a Community Governance Review.

Following local government changes in 2021 the area is governed by West Northamptonshire council.

Prior to that the area was part of East Hunsbury Ward of Northampton Borough Council, electing two members, both Conservative. However, note that the area of Collingtree Park and Collingtree village, although adjacent to East Hunsbury were in the Nene Valley ward for both county and borough elections.

The area was part of East Hunsbury divisions of Northamptonshire County Council, electing one member, a Conservative. The area of Collingtree Park and Collingtree village, although adjacent to East Hunsbury, was in the Nene Valley ward.

== New developments ==
A major urban extension of 2,000 houses, of which ca.35% would be affordable housing was proposed by Bovis Homes in July 2008 at Collingtree Park with all access from Windingbrook Lane, off Rowtree Road. In January 2015 the proposed 1,000 homes were rejected by local residents and borough councillors.

== Famous Residents ==
Derek Redmond was a resident around the time of the 1992 Barcelona olympics.
