= John George Sears =

John George Sears (1870–1916) was a shoe manufacturer and the founder of Sears plc, which was one of the United Kingdom's largest retail businesses.

== Career ==
Born in Northampton and educated at the local elementary school, John Sears became an apprentice with the Manfield Company. In 1891 he set up his own business as a boot-maker with the help of his younger brother, William, trading under the name J. Sears & Co.

In 1897 he opened his first retail outlet and by 1900 he had established his first shop in London. He expanded the business rapidly particularly on the retail side and soon had 2,000 shops branded as Trueform.

In 1913 he bought Collingtree Grange in Northamptonshire. The House was demolished in the mid-20th century and the grounds now form part of Collingtree Park with a golf course. He died in 1916 at the early age of 46 and is buried at St.Columba's Church in Collingtree.

== Family ==
In 1896 he married Caroline Wooding and they had a daughter and two sons.
