= Abbeyfield School =

Abbeyfield School may refer to:

- Abbeyfield School, Chippenham, a secondary school in Wiltshire, England
- Abbeyfield School, Northampton, a secondary school in Northamptonshire, England
