= Unity College Northampton =

Unity College
- Northampton, Northamptonshire, NN2 6JW; England

Information
- Type: Secondary
- Religious affiliation: C of E
- Established: 2004
- Closed: July 2010
- Department for Education URN: 133733 Tables
- Gender: mixed
- Age: 11 to 18
- Enrolment: 1258
- Colour: Purple

Unity College was a mixed 11-16 school in Northampton. It was Northampton's first Church of England College. It had replaced the old school, Trinity High School, which was opened in 1932. The decision was called when the builders found the tower unsafe to redevelop, and the call was made to rebuild the school, which was built in 2004, and all the buildings were completed in 2008. On 20 February 2008, the college held a whole school assembly to mark the date of completion, and a plaque was added into the new visitor entrance block. The school was placed under special measures by Ofsted to be finally closed in 2010. The campus and buildings were taken over by a new school, the Malcolm Arnold Academy, which officially opened on 3 September 2010.

== History ==
Unity College opened on the site of two schools, Trinity School, and Kingsley Park Middle School, which closed as a result of the Northampton Town schools reorganisation. Kingsley Park Middle School occupied the "Old" Northampton Girls School on St. George's Avenue and the Pearson Building on Trinity Avenue. Trinity School was also located on Trinity Avenue and provided the local area with a well-known landmark, "The Trinity Tower". A major redevelopment of the Trinity School site was planned but after consultation and investigation, it became clear that the only course of action was to demolish the old school and replace it with a new purpose built college.

The first part of Unity College, including the Sports areas, English, Science, Maths, and Languages was opened in 2004. The following year a second part of the building housing Student Services, Administration, and Additional Needs teaching areas was opened, and the final and largest part of the building was fully completed in January 2008. The new building provided state of the art facilities including a number of ICT suites, Food Technology rooms, a library, Expressive Arts studios and rooms, Design Technology rooms, and Language and Sixth Form teaching areas. There were more Administration offices, a new visitors reception area, a school chapel, a multi faith room, new catering facilities and dining areas, and a multi purpose atrium (these were built and completed in February 2009).

== Closure ==
After the College was placed in Special Measures following concerns expressed in Ofsted reports, the Peterborough Diocese Board of Education submitted an application for the College to become an Academy from September 2009. Following an announcement in a 12 May press release that the Northamptonshire County Council voted on 11 May to close Northampton’s Unity College, Councillor Andrew Grant, commenting on the reasons for closure, that went unopposed, said: “The school’s performance issues have been well documented and clearly too many of its students are leaving school without an acceptable standard of education." The school closed for the summer holidays on 21 July 2010, marking the end of an era for Unity College. The buildings underwent extensive refurbishing, removing all traces of the former Unity College, to be occupied by a new school, the Malcolm Arnold Academy that opened on the site in September 2010.
