= Collingtree Park =

- District
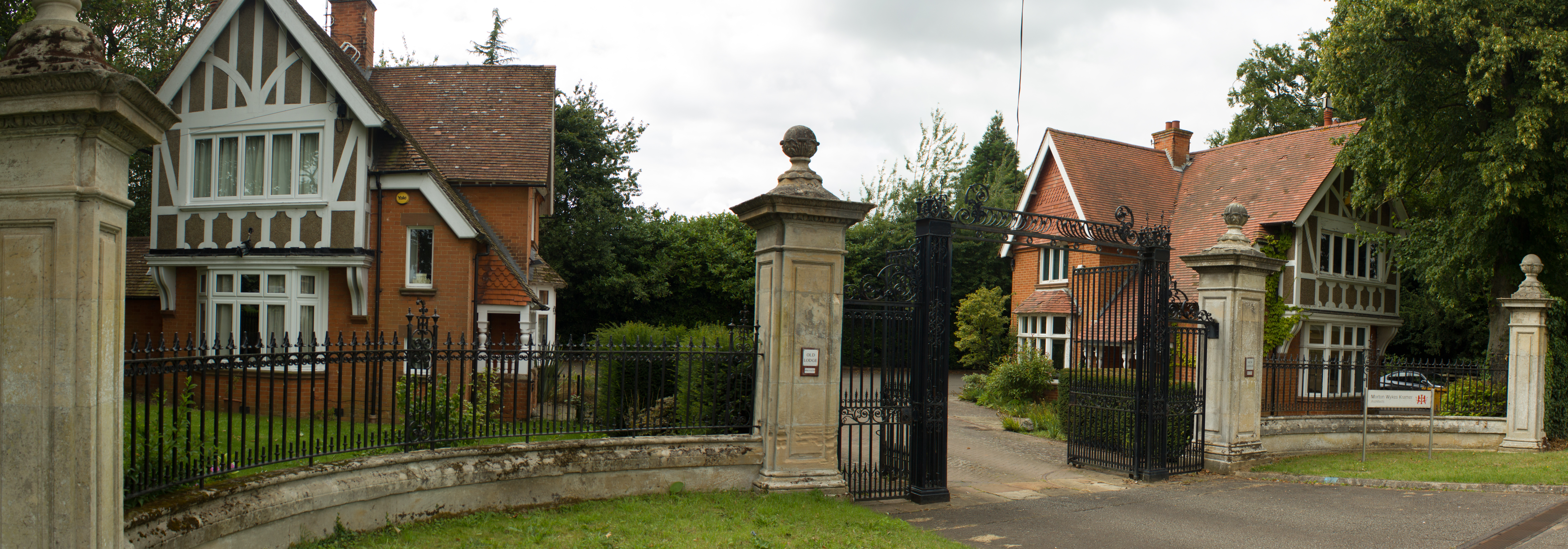
- All that remains of Collingtree Grange

- Location within Northamptonshire
- Coordinates: 52°11′48.16″N 0°54′2.28″W
- Sovereign state: United Kingdom
- Country: England
- Borough: Northampton

Area
  - Total: 0.46 sq mi (1.18 km^{2})
- Elevation: 256 ft (78 m)

Collingtree Park is a district in the Borough of Northampton in the East Midlands of England.

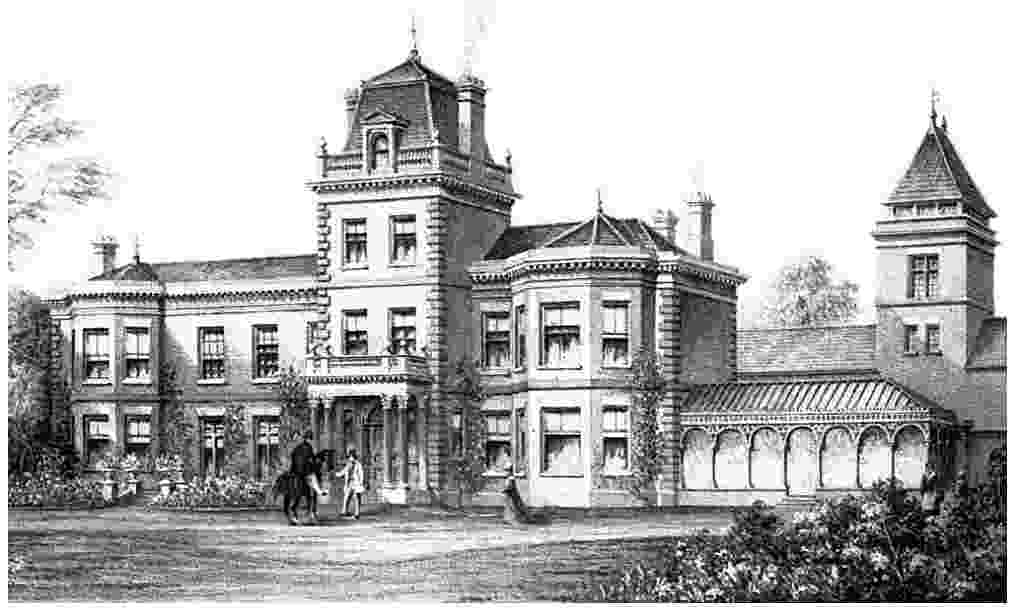
Collingtree Grange, by the architect 1879

== Location ==
Collingtree Park is located at the extreme south of the urban area, due north of the village of Collingtree, which itself is in the Northampton borough. It is currently a small part of the East Hunsbury area of the town.

== History ==
Part of the area is the site of the former Collingtree Grange and park demolished in the 1960s but the many old trees from the original park grounds have been retained. The Grange was constructed in 1875 by a local architect, Edmund Francis Law, for Mr Pickering Phipps, a local brewer. The house was immediately north of the church of St Columba, with the front facing north to north-east. The Sears family, a local boot and shoe manufacturer, purchased the house in 1913 and completely re-planning Glebe Farm. Only the entrance lodges and gateway remain on the A45 road close to an old bridge which carried the main road. The bridge crosses Wootton brook which flows west to join the River Nene on the west side of Northampton. The park still retains a number of tall sequoia trees from the original landscaping but some have been lost by the encroachment of their roots on modern houses built too close.

Collingtree Park is a short walking distance via a bridle path to the historic village of Collingtree. Mentioned the Domesday Book, Collingtree is recorded as 'Colentrev' and as 'trev' is the Celtic word for place, this could well derive from 'the place of St Columb' and be the likely origin of the village name. More details and information about Collingtree village can be found in their local website.

== Facilities ==
There is a Virgin Active (formerly Esporta) Health Club in the park, a Care Home and Collingtree Park Golf Club. A number of large modern houses are an integral part of the golf course. The course was designed by The Open and U.S. Open champion Johnny Miller. The area is close to other facilities in East Hunsbury and near to the A45 road (re-numbered from the A508 road in the early 21st century) and within a mile of M1 junction 15.

== Expansion ==
In July 2008 a proposal. for a major urban extension of housing was being planned by Bovis Homes to the east of the golf course with some remodelling of the course. The extension includes some 2,000 houses of which around 35% will be affordable housing. Access to the site for residents is proposed from Rowtree Road and Windingbrook Lane in East Hunsbury. This still leaves a remaining area for possible future development. Concern has been expressed about access for vehicle to Collingtree Park and East Hunsbury as there are only four entrance/exit points at present and no plans for any more. At the end of 2013 the Bovis proposal was reduced to 1000 houses in an attempt to resolve potential flooding, air pollution and traffic congestion in the area. The local neighbourhood continues to oppose any development whatsoever and this stance is supported by Northampton Borough Councillors and Northampton County Councillors representing the area. As at August 2014 the Independent Government Inspectors Report into the 'soundness' of the Joint Core Strategy for the expansion of Northampton is still awaited. Meanwhile, in late 2013 a large 2 million sq foot warehouse was speculatively proposed along a large section of the south side of the M1 at Collingtree. Expansion south of the M1 was excluded from the original Joint Core Strategy. A formal planning application was submitted in 2014.
