= Collingtree =

Village in Northamptonshire, England

Coordinates: 52.21°N 0.90°W

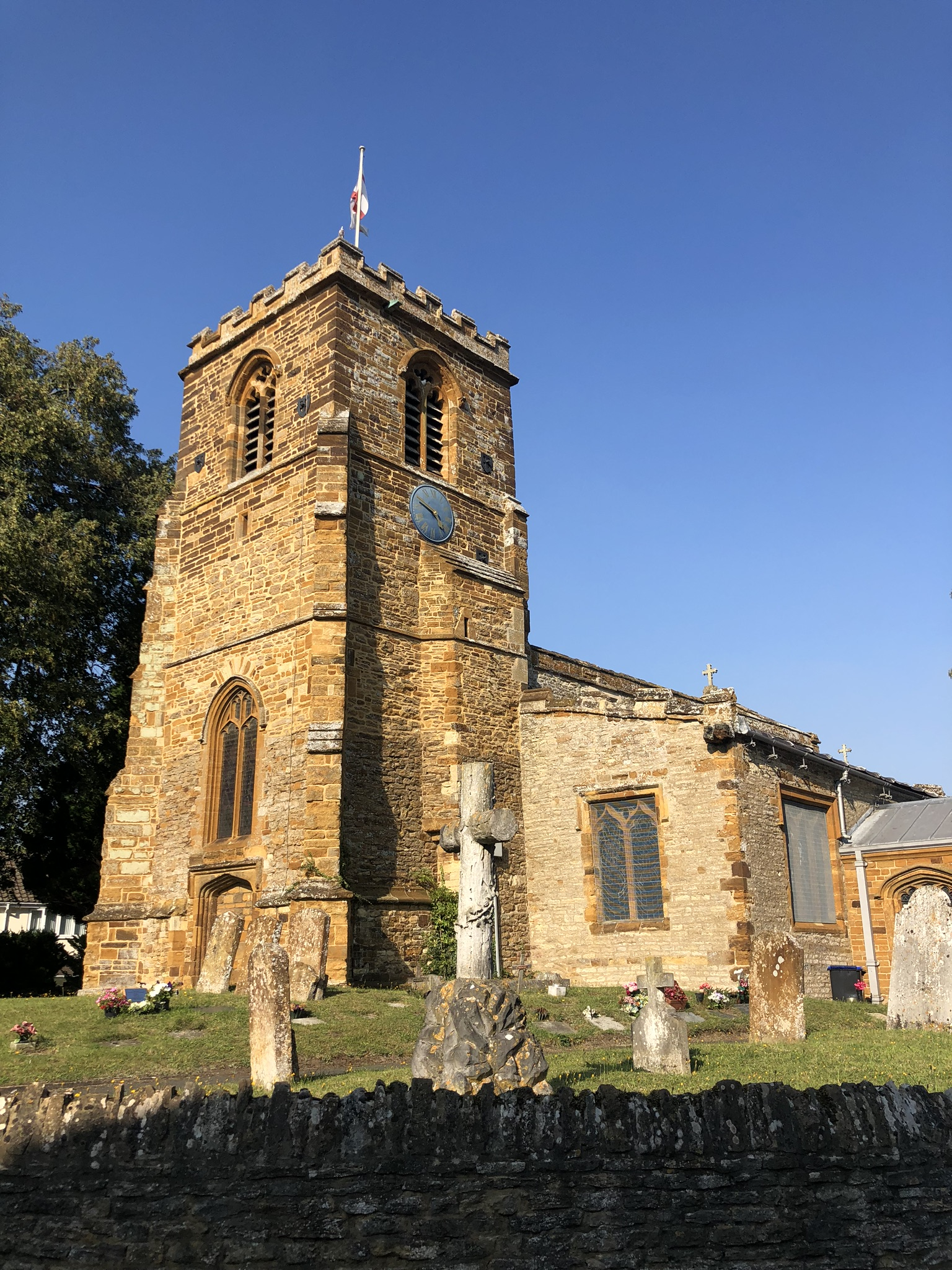
- Church of S Columba, Collingtree

- Location within Northamptonshire
- Population: 1,138 (2011 Census)
- OS grid reference: SP750557
  - London: 65 miles (105 km)
- Civil parish: Collingtree
- Unitary authority: West Northamptonshire
- Ceremonial county: Northamptonshire
- Region: East Midlands
- Country: England
- Sovereign state: United Kingdom
- Post town: NORTHAMPTON
- Postcode district: NN4
- Dialling code: 01604
- Police: Northamptonshire
- Fire: Northamptonshire
- Ambulance: East Midlands
- UK Parliament: Northampton South

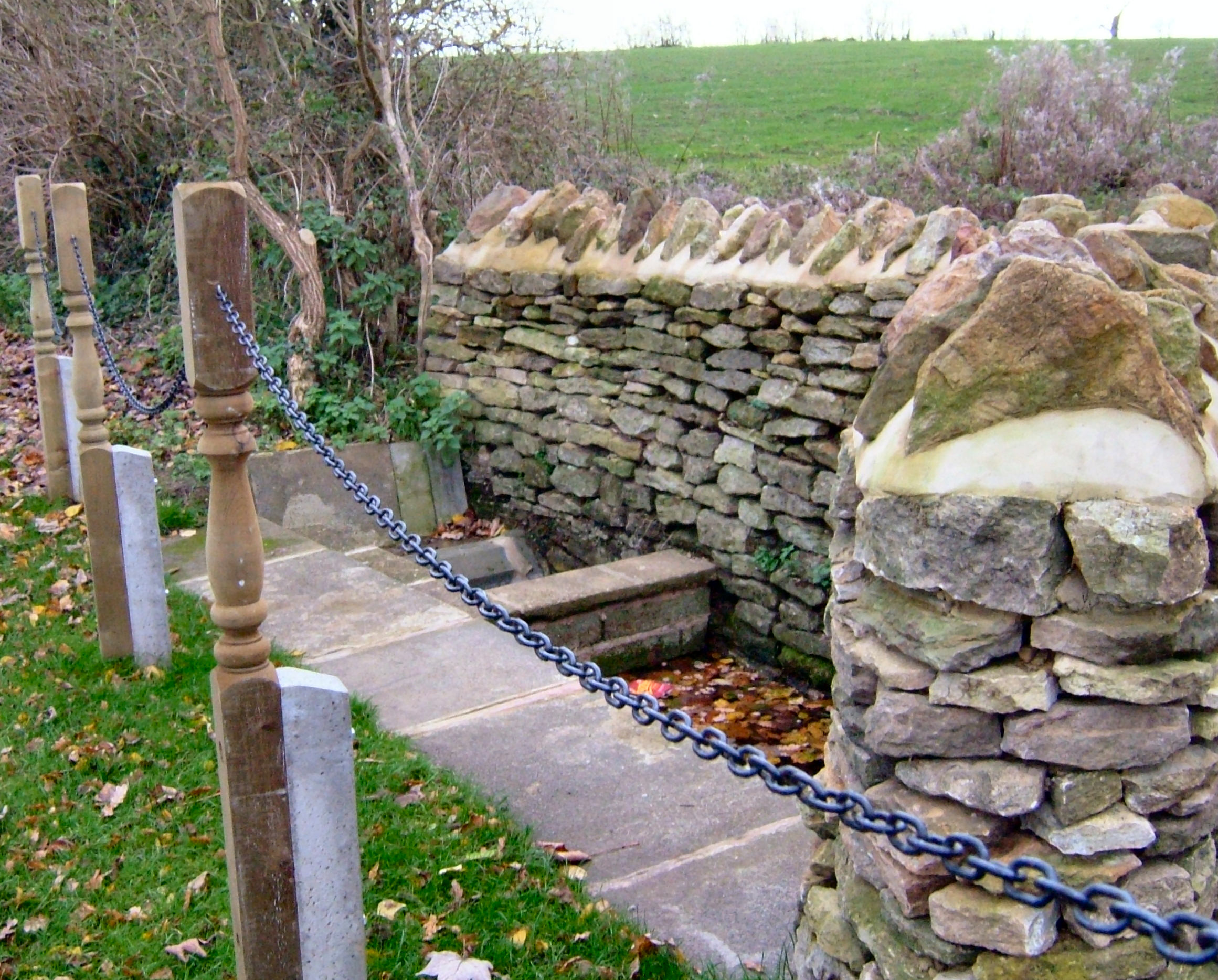
Colling Trough in Collingtree

Collingtree is a village and civil parish in the West Northamptonshire district of Northamptonshire, England. It is part of the Northampton built-up area.

== Location and context ==
The village is about 3 miles (5 km) from Northampton town centre, close to the A45 trunk road which heads east to Wellingborough and Peterborough. The busy A45 also connects to junction 15 of the M1 London to Yorkshire Motorway by way of a flyover which eliminated a dangerous crossing of the main road. The motorway is adjacent to the south-west side of the village and a road bridge connects Collingtree to the adjacent village of Milton Malsor, about a mile west. Both Central London and Birmingham are about 64 miles (103 km) south and north-west, respectively.

Wootton Brook flows in a small valley through a golf course on the northern side towards West Hunsbury where it joins the River Nene before the river enters Northampton.

== Demographics ==
A church publication in 1999 stated that there were 154 parishioners in 1801, and 234 in 1851. The census returns for 1881 note only 240 inhabitants. The 2001 census. showed there were 1,655 people living in the village, 806 male, 849 female, in 651 dwellings. This includes the area of Collingtree Park around Collingtree Golf Course north of the village which was formerly the site of Collingtree Grange. At the 2011 census the listed population for Collingtree Civil Parish was 1,138.

== History ==
In the Domesday Book the settlement is referred to as Collingtrev or Colentreu, Colen being Celtic for place and trev possibly meaning 'tree' or trough. Others think that Colen is a version of St Columba to whom the village church was dedicated in 1170. In the 15th century the village is referred to as Colyngtrowgh and in the 17th century as Collingtrough. The trough is certainly the basis for the name of the main road, Watering Lane, from the A45 up to the crossroads at the centre of the village. Cattle and steam engines collected water from the spring here. In 2006 its site was revealed when undergrowth was cleared back from the side of the road and the Parish Council decided to make a feature of it. A more likely explanation for the name is in a 2008 document from the borough council dealing with conservation. This mentions that: "Collingtree probably had Saxon origins" and that its name is thought to be derived from "Cola's tree", after an Anglo-Saxon leader's name and a notable tree, possibly a boundary tree.

The centre of Collingtree was designated a Conservation Area in 1978. In 2008, the borough council asked for comments on a draft Re-appraisal and Management Plan for the Conservation Area. The proposed changes to the area are to expand the work to preserve the history and character of the village. The historic 17th- to 19th-century buildings, the 10 listed buildings, the layout of boundary walls and the use of local stone, combine to create a distinctive location with a strong sense of place, worthy of protection and enhancement. The Management Plan outlines how to protect the historic character and actively manage the area, including preserving the existing character through to the control of advertisements and the monitoring of change.

The village has one of the most unusual High Streets in the country. It runs roughly north to south, has a pub, The Wooden Walls of Old England, but no shops and leads nowhere in either direction. The village grew on a route between Blisworth in the south and Wootton in the north. The southbound route was cut off in the 1950s by the building of the M1 motorway. The northern part was cut off when Collingtree Grange was built and is now cut off by the golf course. The oldest houses are 17th-century, of which four are listed, all in the High Street. No.43 is Grade II* listed. Another five listed buildings, in the High Street and Barn Corner are 18th-century. The form of the village is largely unchanged since about 1800 or earlier.

An application by the company Bovis to build 1,000 houses close to the village in East Hunsbury was proposed in 2014. It was rejected by the Northampton Borough Council as it would affect the setting of the village and the Conservation Area. When the area was designated in 1978 it was intended to ensure that any changes which take place harmonise with the existing area.... At the time of writing, the application has been called in by the Secretary of State. Collingtree and East Hunsbury are supporting the borough council and defending its position. An application to build a large complex of warehouses and a rail freight terminal on the south site of the M1 adjacent to Collingtree was strongly opposed and finally withdrawn after strong opposition from Collingtree and other local parishes.

== Governance ==
The village has its own Parish Council. It was incorporated into the Northampton Borough Council area in the boundary changes of 1974 but in spite of this still retains its distinct village nature. The village is, together with Collingtree Park, part of the two-member Nene Valley ward on the borough council, both Conservative held. On the county council, the village is part of the division of the same name, with a single member, also Conservative.

== Facilities ==
The busy M1 motorway runs alongside the village to the south west and can be seen and heard. The village has a Primary School; Church, St Columba (Church of England); pub, (The Wooden Walls of Old England) in the High Street; Collingtree Tennis Club and Hilton Hotel and sports club in Watering Lane near the junction with the A45. Until 2009, the church was grouped with Courteenhall and Milton Malsor in the Three Parishes Group. Collingtree Park Golf Club, with adjacent large modern houses, is just north of the village in the grounds of the demolished Grange, but access to this is from Windingbrook Lane and Rowtree Road in East Hunsbury, just off the A45. The designated secondary school is Elizabeth Woodville School in Roade.

== Development ==
A major urban extension of 2,000 houses, of which ca.35% would be affordable was proposed by Bovis Homes in July 2008 at the adjacent Collingtree Park and it is likely to begin construction in 2015. In 2013 a large two million sq foot warehouse was proposed along a large section of the south side of the M1 at Collingtree with a formal planning application in December 2014. The application is strongly opposed by local residents and eventually abandoned. The development was in the area of South Northamptonshire Council and was specifically excluded from development in the local plan.

== People ==
- Jill Knight, Baroness Knight of Collingtree (1924-2022) former Conservative MP for Edgbaston from 1966–97, was a village resident.
- John George Sears (1870–1916) was a shoe manufacturer and the founder of Sears plc, which was one of the UK's largest retail businesses. He lived in Collingtree Grange. He is buried in St Columba's churchyard.
- William Wood the Botanist was born in the village in 1745.

== See also ==
- Collingtree Village website
