= Commsave Credit Union =

British financial co-operative

- Founded: 1991
- Type: Industrial and Provident Society
- Location: 2 Summerhouse Road, Moulton Park Industrial Estate, Northampton, NN3 6BJ
- Website: commsave.co.uk

Commsave Credit Union Limited is a not-for-profit member-owned financial co-operative, based in Northampton in the English Midlands. In 2020, it absorbed Northamptonshire Credit Union (trading as Harvest Money). As at 31 March 2024, Commsave has 35,488 members with £89.5m worth of savings and £75.2m on loan to members.

== History ==
=== Commsave ===
Northamptonshire Postal Workers Credit Union was originally established in 1991, becoming East Midlands Postal Workers Credit Union in 1996 and finally, Commsave Credit Union in 2002.

=== Harvest Money ===
Northampton Borough Council Employees Credit Union was originally established by the payroll department to help council workers in 1997. It became Northampton Credit Union in 2003 and finally, Northamptonshire Credit Union in 2013, rebranding as Harvest Money on its twentieth anniversary in 2017.

In 2013, Golden Sheaf Credit Union, established in Kettering in 2001 and The Five Wells Credit Union, established in Wellingborough in 2001, transferred engagements to Northamptonshire Credit Union.

In 2015, the credit union was awarded a grant of £67,500 by the Lloyds Banking Group Credit Union Development Fund to increase its capital asset ratio to support growth in membership and assets.

More recently, Weston Favell and District Credit Union, established in Northampton in 1980, transferred engagements in 2016, followed by Blackbird Leys Credit Union, established in Oxford in 1994, in 2017.

At the time of the merger with Commsave, Harvest Money had 2,205 members and assets in excess of £1m.

== Activities ==
The members of a credit union are required to share a common bond. In the case of Northamptonshire Credit Union, membership was restricted to people residing or working in the county of Northamptonshire or the surrounding districts of Milton Keynes, Bedford, Central Bedfordshire, Cherwell, the City of Oxford, Vale of White Horse and South Oxfordshire.

Membership of Commsave Credit Union is restricted to people living or working in the NN postcode area or who work for one of a number organisations, including Royal Mail, Departments of HM Government and their associated agencies or public bodies or who are members of Unite the Union.

A member of the Association of British Credit Unions Limited, registered under the Industrial and Provident Societies Acts, Commsave Credit Union is authorised by the Prudential Regulation Authority and regulated by the Financial Conduct Authority and PRA. Ultimately, like the banks and building societies, members' savings are protected against business failure by the Financial Services Compensation Scheme.

== See also ==
- Credit unions in the United Kingdom
- British co-operative movement
- Penny Post Credit Union
- 1st Class Credit Union
