= Northampton Guildhall =

Municipal building in Northampton, Northamptonshire, England

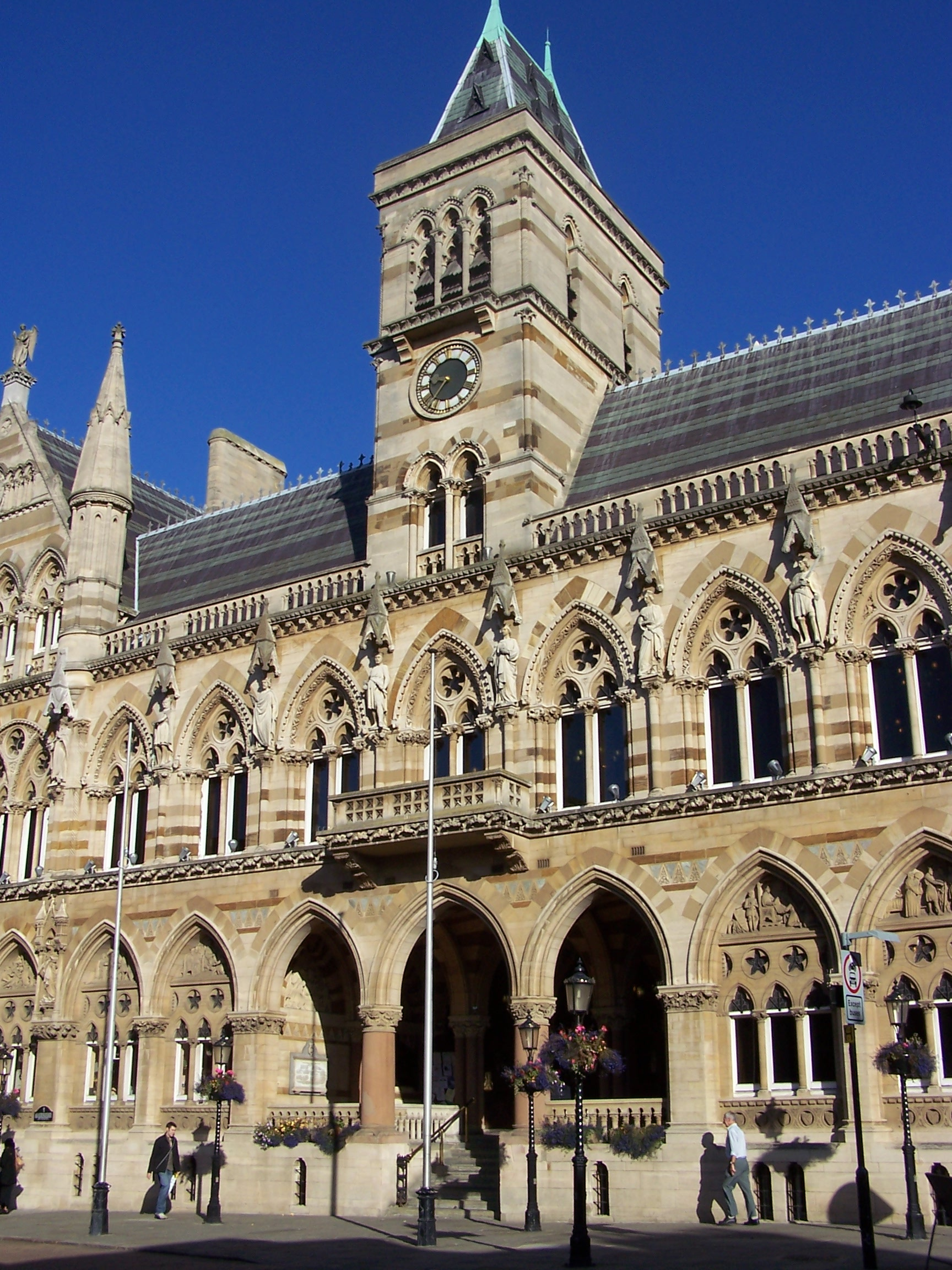

- Location within Northamptonshire
- 52°14′14″N 0°53′41″W
- Location: Northampton, Northamptonshire

History
- Built: 1864

Site notes
- Architect: Edward William Godwin
- Architectural style: Gothic Revival style

Listed Building – Grade II*
- Designated: 19 January 1952
- Reference no.: 1052399

Northampton Guildhall is a municipal building in St Giles' Square in Northampton, England. It is a Grade II* listed building.

== History ==
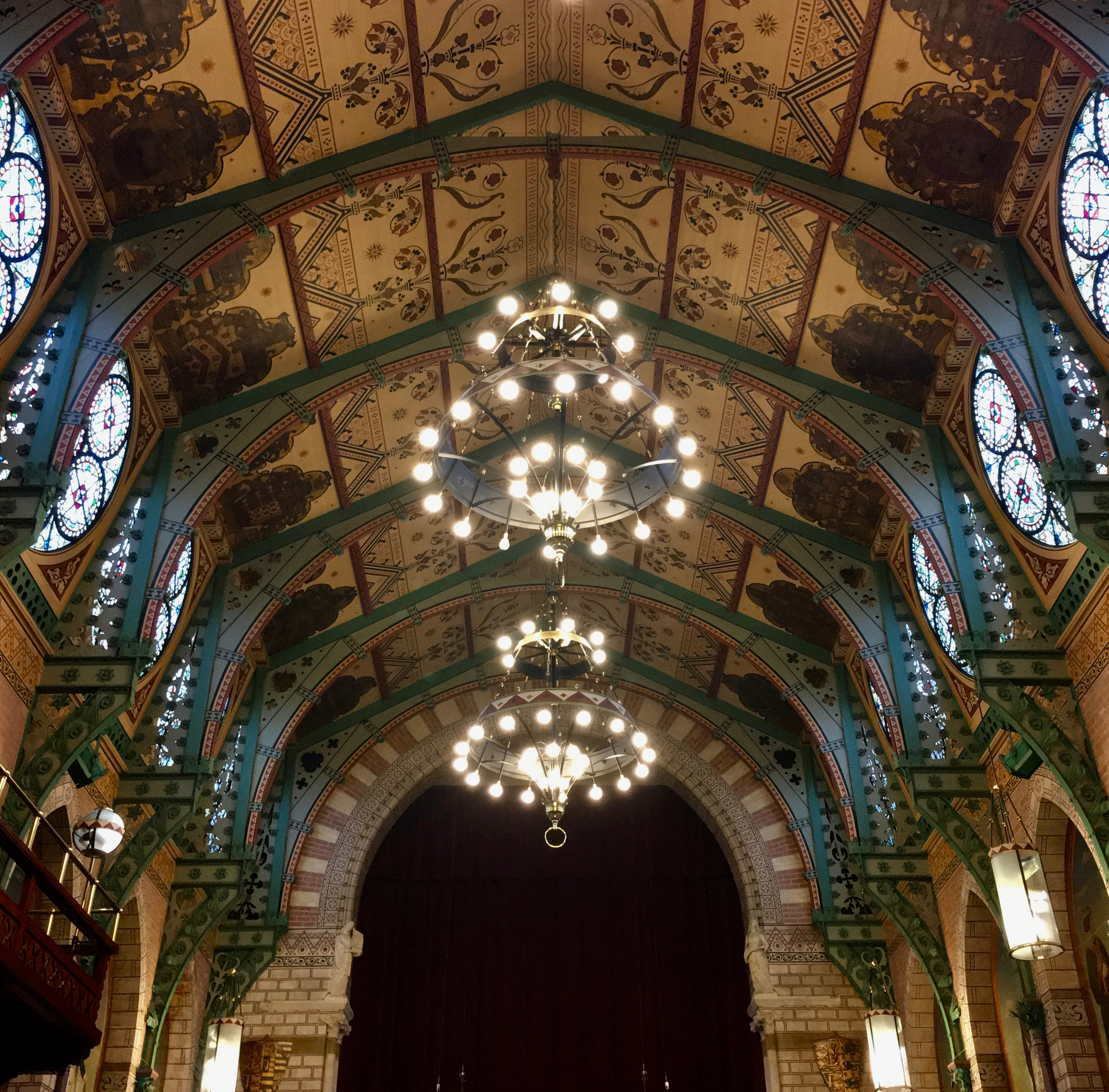
The Great Hall

The first guildhall in Northampton was a 12th-century building at the junction of Gold Street and Horsemarket. The second guildhall was an early 14th-century battlemented structure at the corner of Abington Street and Wood Hill; it was sold in 1864 and subsequently demolished.

The current building, the third guildhall, designed by Edward William Godwin in the Gothic Revival style, was officially opened on 17 May 1864. The original part of the building was symmetrical with three first-floor windows either side of the main entrance, above which rose a clock tower with a steeply pitched roof. The clock, by J. Moore & Sons of Clerkenwell, was installed in 1867, along with a hemispherical bell to strike the hours.

The building was extended to the west to the designs of A W Jeffrey and Matthew Holding in 1892, creating a frontage of 14 bays with arcading on the ground floor and windows above on the first floor. The sculptor R.L. Bolton was commissioned to design 14 statues of monarchs and other famous people which were erected on the front elevation between the windows on the first floor. A modern extension to the east, built to accommodate the expanding office needs of Northampton Borough Council, was completed in 1992.

Inside, the great hall displays murals of famous local men, painted by Colin Gill in 1925. It also contains murals of The Muses Contemplating Northampton, painted by Henry Bird in 1949. A statue by Sir Francis Chantrey of Spencer Perceval, Member of Parliament for Northampton and the only British Prime Minister to have been assassinated, was originally unveiled in 1817 and is also on display inside.

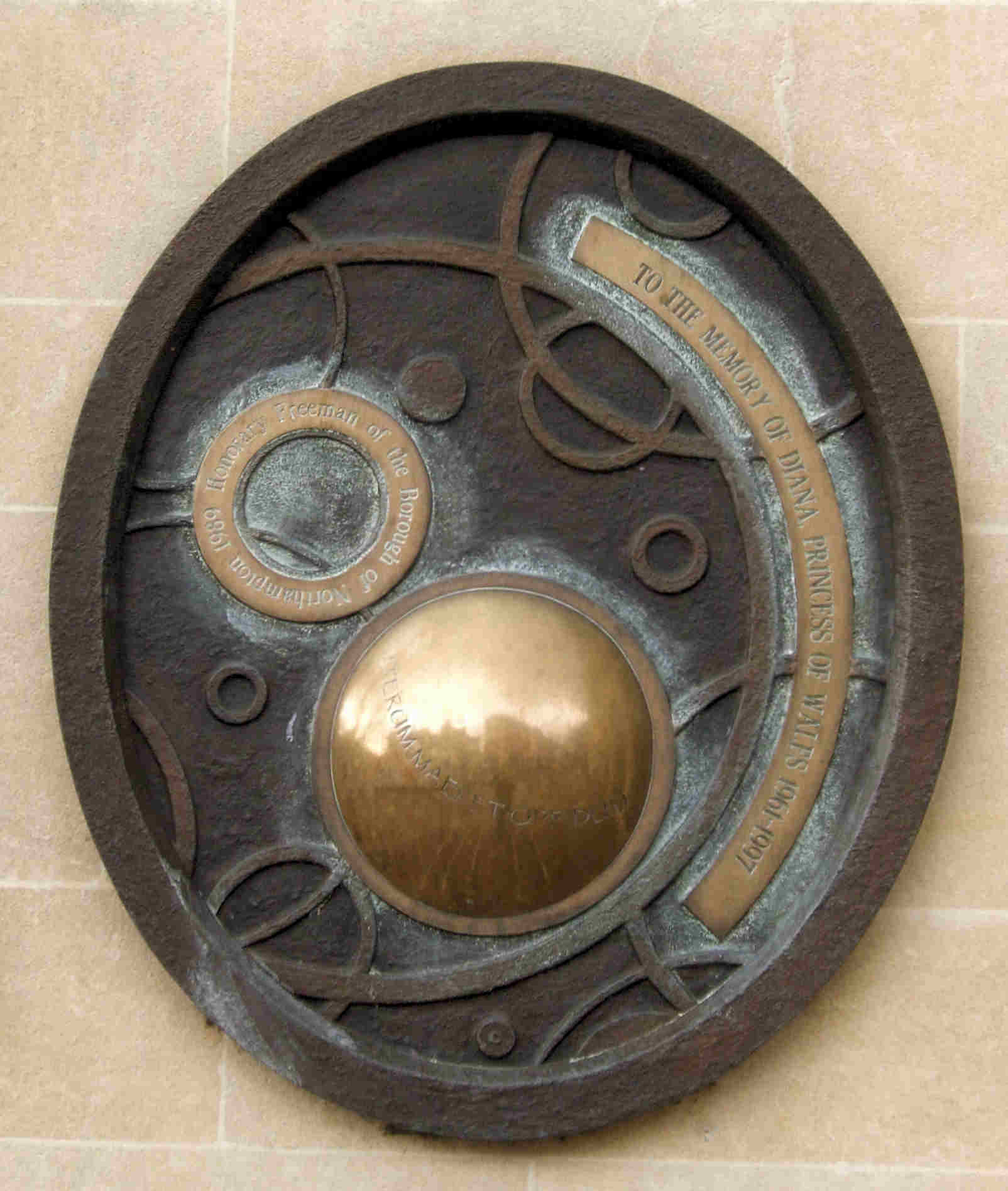
Memorial on Northampton Guildhall to Diana, Princess of Wales

A plaque on the eastern extension marks the fact that Diana, Princess of Wales, was made a Freeman of the Borough of Northampton in 1989, marking her and her family's strong connections with the town and with Althorp where she was brought up and is buried. The plaque below the memorial reads: "The memorial above was unveiled by the 9th Earl Spencer in memory of his sister, 7 November 2002 in the presence of the Mayor of Northampton, Michael Geoffrey Boss".

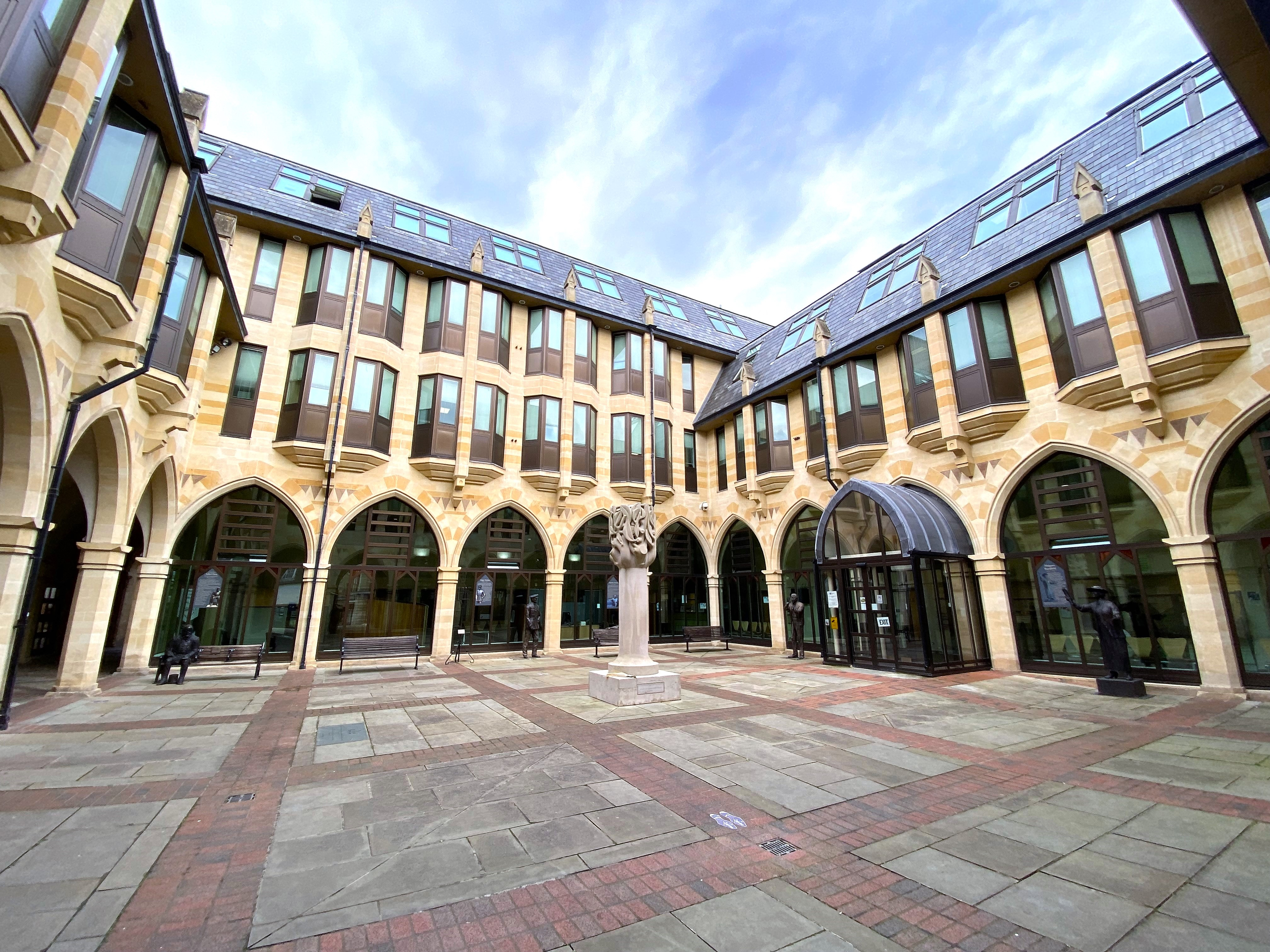
Courtyard within the 1992 extension.

A series of bronze statues of Northampton's "history makers", cast by the sculptor Richard Austin, were unveiled in July 2017 within the courtyard of the 1992 extension.

== See also ==
- Guild
- Guildhall
