= Malcolm Arnold Academy =

Location
- Trinity Avenue; Northampton, Northamptonshire, NN2 6JW; England; 52.2539°N 0.8913°W

Information
- Type: Academy
- Religious affiliation: Church of England
- Established: 2010; 16 years ago
- Department for Education URN: 136201 Tables
- Ofsted: Reports
- Gender: Mixed
- Age: 11 to 18
- Enrolment: 1,341
- Houses: Wisdom, Diligence, Resilience
- Colours: Blue and gold
- DBE number: 106
- Website: www.malcolmarnoldacademy.co.uk

Malcolm Arnold Academy is a co-educational comprehensive secondary school with academy status in Northampton, England, for pupils aged 11 – 18. It was established in 2010 following the closure of the Unity College in July of that year, and opened for year 7 and ages 16+ on 3 September 2010, and for other years on 6 September. The academy occupies the campus of the former Unity College and has the capacity for 1,450 pupils. The academy is a Church of England foundation academy.

== History ==
The academy was established following an announcement on 12 May 2010 by Northamptonshire County Council that Northampton's Unity College was to be closed following continued poor performance reported by Ofsted. It was further announced that a new school would be opened under the leadership of the David Ross Education Trust, which proposed that the new academy would specialise in mathematics and music. In addition to these specialist subjects, the academy would offer students a broad and balanced academic and vocational curriculum. David Ross, chairman of the foundation, said: "Closing a school is never an easy decision, however we believe it is in the best interests of students, staff, parents and the wider community to open a new academy that will offer a world-class education." The David Ross Foundation also sponsors the Havelock Academy in Grimsby, which opened in 2007. The new school is funded by the Department of Education.

The academy, a specialist maths and music college, is named after Malcolm Arnold, the English composer, who was born in Northampton.

== Admissions ==
Admission is granted primarily to members of the Church of England. The school is fed by the link schools of All Saints CEVA Primary School, Collingtree CEVA Primary School, St Andrew's CEVA Primary School, St James' CEVA Primary School, St Luke's CEVA Primary School, Weston Favell CEVA Primary School, or any other church that is a member of Churches Together in England, followed by members of a religion affiliated to the British Interfaith Network. Pupils must live within the areas governed by the Borough of Northampton.

== Football scholarship scheme ==
In February 2014 it was announced that the academy would be forming a Post-16 Football Scholarship scheme with local semi-professional club AFC Rushden & Diamonds.
