= Pickering Phipps =

Pickering Phipps is the name of three related men – father, grandson and great grandson – who were residents of Northampton, England in the 19th and 20th centuries. The first began the Phipps Brewery in Towcester in 1801. The company survives today as Phipps NBC.

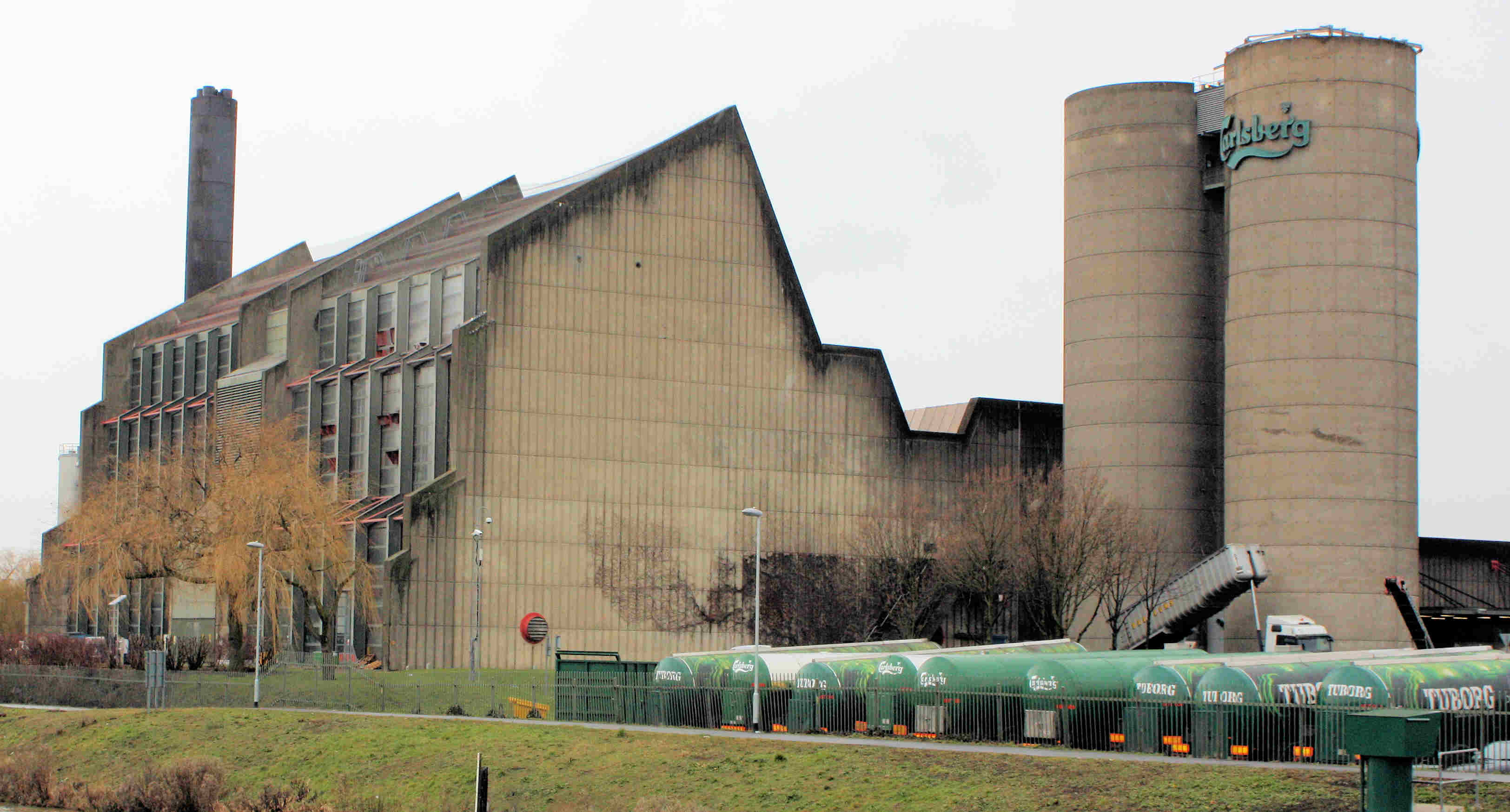
Carlsberg brewery in Northampton, built on the site of the Phipps brewery in 1973

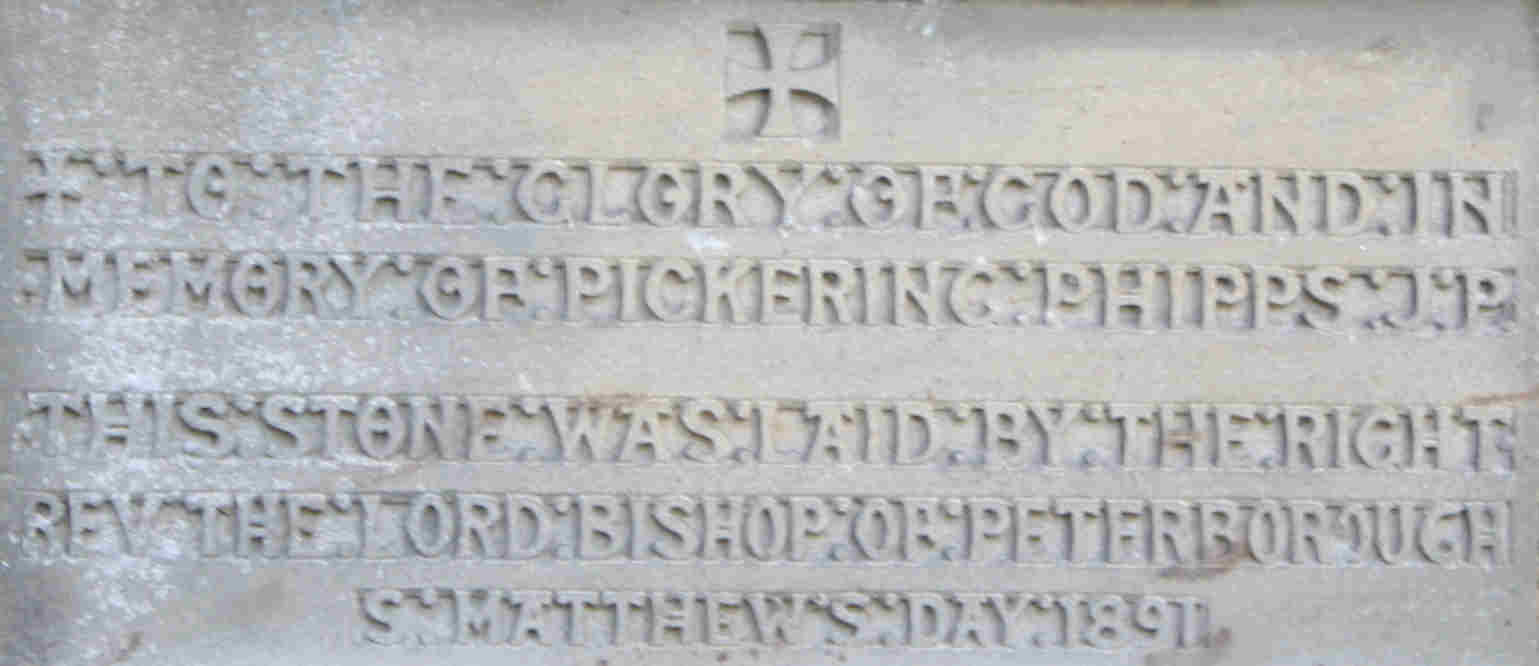
Foundation Stone of St Matthew's Church, Northampton, built in memory of Phipps II

== Pickering Phipps I ==
Pickering Phipps (1772–1830) founded a brewery in Towcester, Northamptonshire in 1801. In 1817, he opened a brewery in Bridge Street, Northampton, near to the River Nene and since 1973, the site of a large Carlsberg brewery by Danish architect Knud Munk. He became mayor of Northampton in 1821. He had five sons, two of whom, Richard and Thomas, inherited the business, as later did a grandson and great grandson, both named Pickering Phipps.

== Pickering Phipps II ==
Pickering Phipps II (1827–1890), son of Pickering Phipps I's third son Edward, also held tenure as mayor of Northampton between 1860 and 1866, a JP as well as most notably serving as the Conservative Member of Parliament for Northampton from 1874 to 1880 and for South Northamptonshire from 1881 to 1885. He built Collingtree Grange in 1875, which was since demolished, though the entrance lodges and gateway on the A45 road still survive.

== Pickering Phipps III ==
Pickering Phipps III (1861–1937) became a director of the company in 1886. In 1888, the company built new offices at 8 Gold Street, Northampton. In 1891, the Church of St Matthew in Kettering Road, Northampton was built and paid for by the family in memory of Phipps II. This area of the town southeast of Kettering Road, known as "Phippsville" was built in the 1880s as a spacious, well-to-do suburb of the town. The large houses are now mostly converted into individual flats. Pickering IIIrd's Northampton home on Cliftonville Road is now the head offices and showroom of the Jeffery-West shoe company. He was High Sheriff of Northamptonshire in 1897. He sold the Collingtree Grange Estate to the Sears family in 1913.

== Northampton pubs ==
Both Pickering Phipps II and his great local rival, the Liberal MP for Northampton Charles Bradlaugh, have pubs named after them in Northampton. Included amongst these is the 'Sir Pickering Phipps' on Wellingborough Road named after Pickering Phipps II, who, despite the name, holds no known evidence of having ever been knighted.
