= Caroline Chisholm School =

Location
- Wooldale Road, Wootton; Northampton, Northamptonshire, NN4 6TP; England; 52.198697°N 0.873928°W

Information
- Type: Academy
- Established: 2004
- Local authority: West Northamptonshire
- Department for Education URN: 137089 Tables
- Ofsted: Reports
- Chair of Trustees: Louise Samways
- Headteacher: Chris Bishop
- Gender: Mixed
- Age: 4 to 18
- Enrolment: 2043
- Houses: Brisbane, Melbourne, Perth and Sydney
- Website: http://www.ccs.northants.sch.uk

Caroline Chisholm School is a mixed all-through school with academy status, in Wootton, south Northampton, England. It is named after Caroline Chisholm, a 19th-century social reformer. The principal is Chris Bishop. The school was built in 15 months and cost £25 million. The school added its final year, Year 13, in September 2008. In 2005, admission arrangements were changed to give siblings of existing students at the school greater priority for places.

== Design ==
The school has 5 blocks, A Block (Music, Drama and PE), B Block (Languages and Humanities), C Block (Maths and English), D Block (Technology and Science), E Block (Sixth Form Centre, ICT, Business and Art). The school has a two-form entry Primary Phase with its own studio, multi-purpose room, 14 classrooms and playground area. The site also has a cafeteria, takeaway area, ICT suites, drama studios, gym, art display area, and public meeting rooms.

== Distinctions ==
- This was the first through 4-18 state school in the UK.
- The school was mentioned in the House of Lords when it was confirmed that this was one of six schools in England defined as a middle school that educates Year 11 pupils.
- Education Secretary Ruth Kelly visited the school on 17 March 2005.

== Community involvement ==
The school is in the Wooldale Centre for Learning, a multi-use community facility. Caroline Chisholm has been described as "unique and ground breaking" for the way it is linked into the community including offering sports and learning facilities for the community.

== Academic standards ==
Ofsted's report of 17 May 2006 describes the school as:

Caroline Chisholm is a good school with many outstanding features, a view shared by parents and reflected in the school’s self-evaluation. Outstanding features such as the quality and standards in the Foundation Stage, the progress made by pupils with a statement of autism spectrum disorders, the behaviour and attitudes of all pupils, and the personal development and well-being of pupils make Caroline Chisholm a unique school.

It had 'outstanding' outcome from its Ofsted report in July 2009, while they received a 'good' outcome from their Ofsted report in 2012. Caroline Chisholm school received 'requires improvement' by Ofsted in 2018. In their latest report in January 2020, the school received a 'good' rating with an 'outstanding' Early Years Foundation Stage.

== Catchment area row ==
Although the area is next to the large housing development of Grange Park, a proposal in January 2010 by Northamptonshire County Council to remove Woodland View Primary School in Grange Park as a feeder school provoked huge protest from Grange Park parents. The alternative schools proposed were Elizabeth Woodville School (formerly Roade School Sports College) and Abbeyfield School. (formerly Mereway Secondary School).

== Alumni ==
- Matthew Broome, actor
- Gen Kitchen, Labour politician
- Scott Pollock, professional footballer
