= Duston =

Suburb of Northampton, England

Coordinates: 52.2470°N 0.9437°W

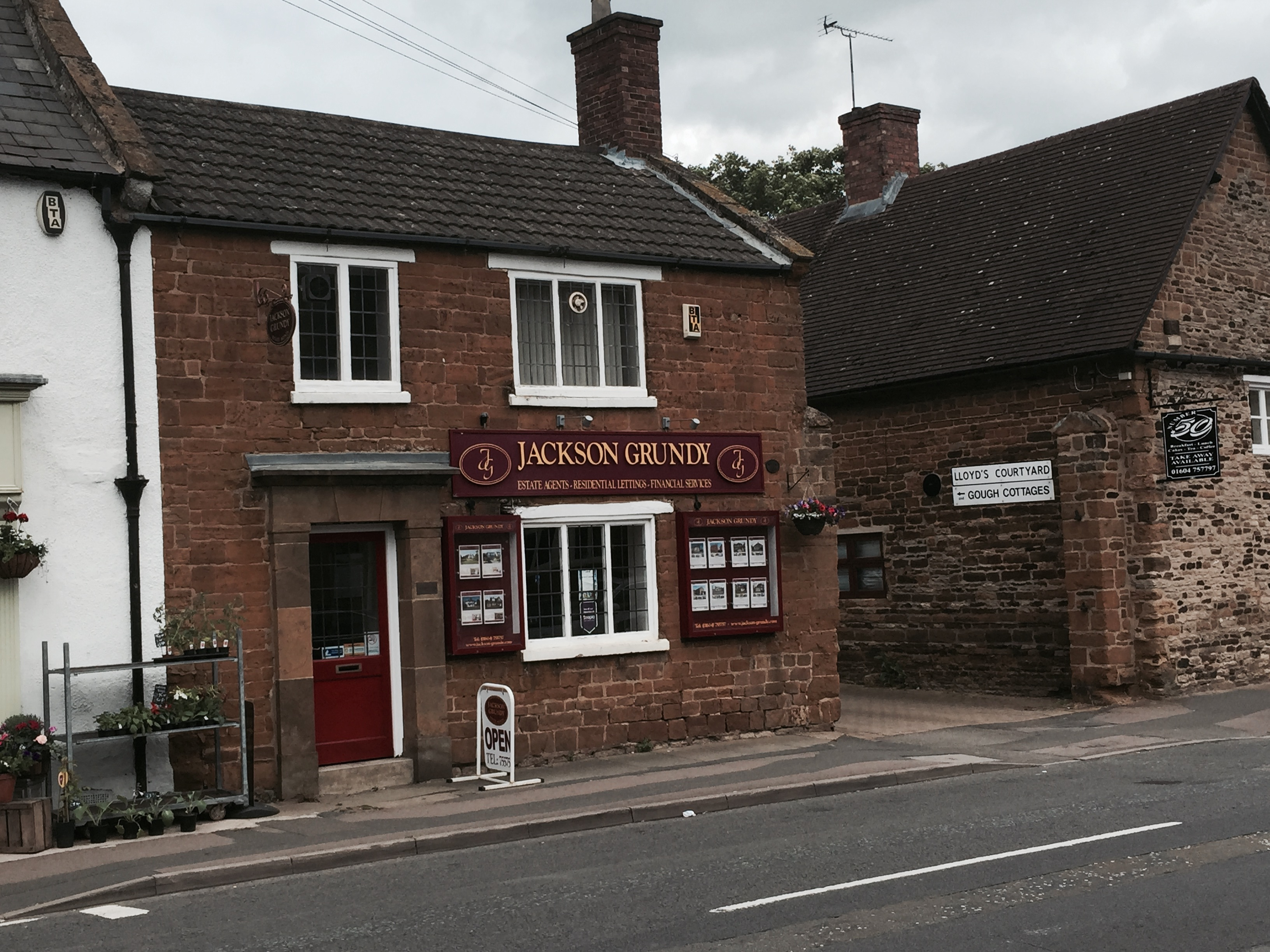
- Typical buildings on Main Road, in the village

- Location within Northamptonshire
- Population: 15,565; 15,498 (2011 census)
- OS grid reference: SP7261
- Unitary authority: West Northamptonshire
- Ceremonial county: Northamptonshire
- Region: East Midlands
- Country: England
- Sovereign state: United Kingdom
- Post town: Northampton
- Postcode district: NN5
- Dialling code: 01604
- Police: Northamptonshire
- Fire: Northamptonshire
- Ambulance: East Midlands
- UK Parliament: Northampton South
- Website: duston-pc.gov.uk

Duston is a suburb of Northampton and a civil parish in West Northamptonshire, England.

== History ==
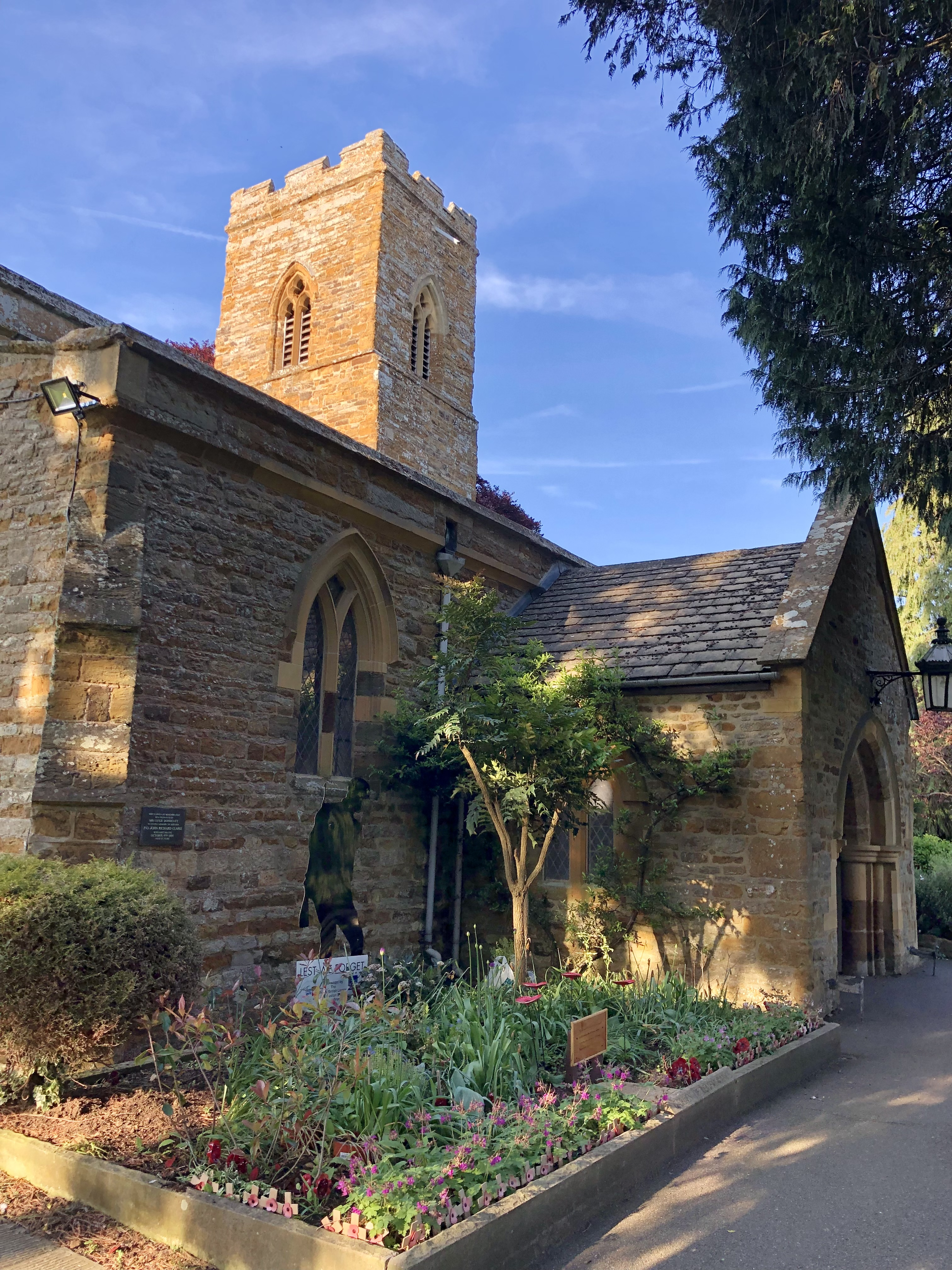
St Luke's Church

Archaeological remains found in the area suggest that Duston has roots in Prehistoric and Roman settlements. However, development in the area has meant that it is now difficult to find further remains.

Duston has been a settlement since at least Roman times, and grew as a village in Anglo-Saxon times. In the Domesday Book, The name "Duston" derives from Old English words meaning either farmstead on a mound or farmstead with dusty soil. Duston was recorded as a farming community. St Luke's Church was built in the 12th century and has many medieval features. The old village was built up around this and has gradually moved westwards along Main Road.

From 1876 to 1995 Duston was home to St Crispin's Hospital, a county-owned and subsequently NHS mental hospital. During the First World War it was turned into Duston War Hospital for convalescent soldiers.

Since the 1950s, the historical village has been engulfed by the expansion of Northampton. Most development in Duston has been residential, but the original village still contains many of its old buildings within its nucleus and is now a conservation area. The civil parish population was 15,498 at the 2011 census.

A major housing development, Dallington Grange, is planned to extend Duston northwards towards Harlestone. The development will include a new secondary school, two new primary schools, and 3,000 homes.

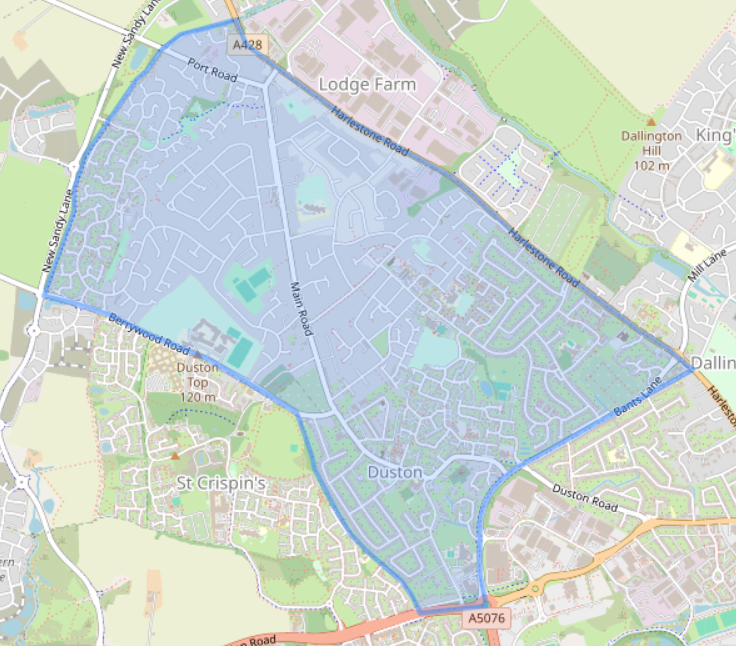
Duston modern parish boundaries

=== Industrial history ===
Iron ore was first quarried in the district in 1854 and 1855 to the east of the village on land leased from Viscount Palmerston and from Duston Church (St Luke's.) At that time the ore was quarried mostly to the south of the Northampton to Daventry road, but also on the other side. The quarry was connected by railway to the Northampton branch of the canal, close to Duston Mill where the ore trucks were emptied into canal boats for transport to an ironworks elsewhere. The trucks descended when full by gravity and when emptied were hauled back to the quarry by horses. The quarry was re-opened in 1859 and the railway was extended under the road as the quarry was extended on that side. Steam locomotives were used on the railway from 1861 onwards. Quarrying finished on the south side of the road in 1905 and on the north side of the road in 1908.

There was also a limestone quarry to the north side of Bants Lane which closed by 1901. It was connected to the railway by a narrow gauge tramway. Limestone trucks were emptied into standard gauge trucks in the iron ore quarry.

A branch of the railway connected with a claypit and brickworks and an iron foundry in the St James district of Northampton. By 1883 the sidings next to the canal were closed and the line extended across the canal to sidings on the Northampton to Blisworth railway, close to the Hunsbury Ironworks. The iron ore quarry site is now built on, being the site of an industrial and retail estate. Most of the course of the railway southwards was obliterated when the area was dug for gravel in the 1960s and by the construction of the Northampton Town football ground in the 1990s. The bridge over the canal (altered) is still there. A quarry face still remains close to Duston Road.

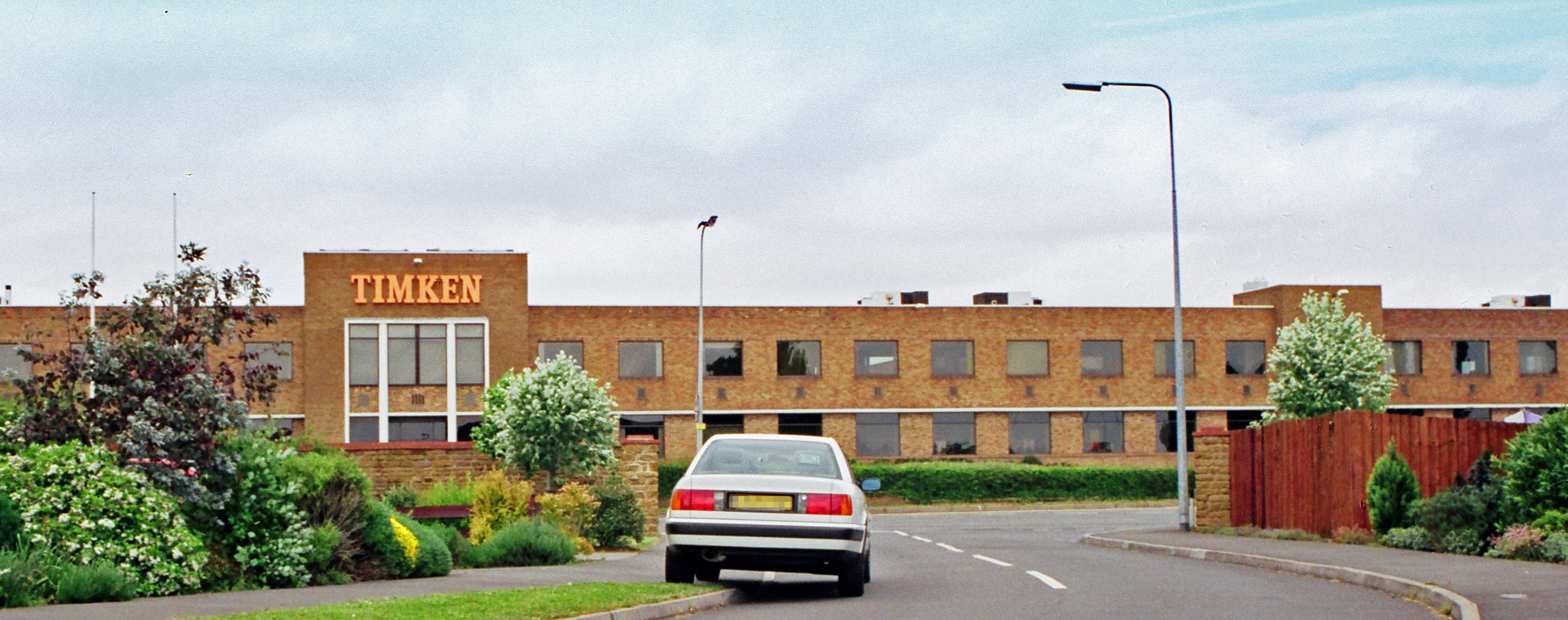
British Timken offices and works in Northampton, England in 2001 prior to demolition a few years later

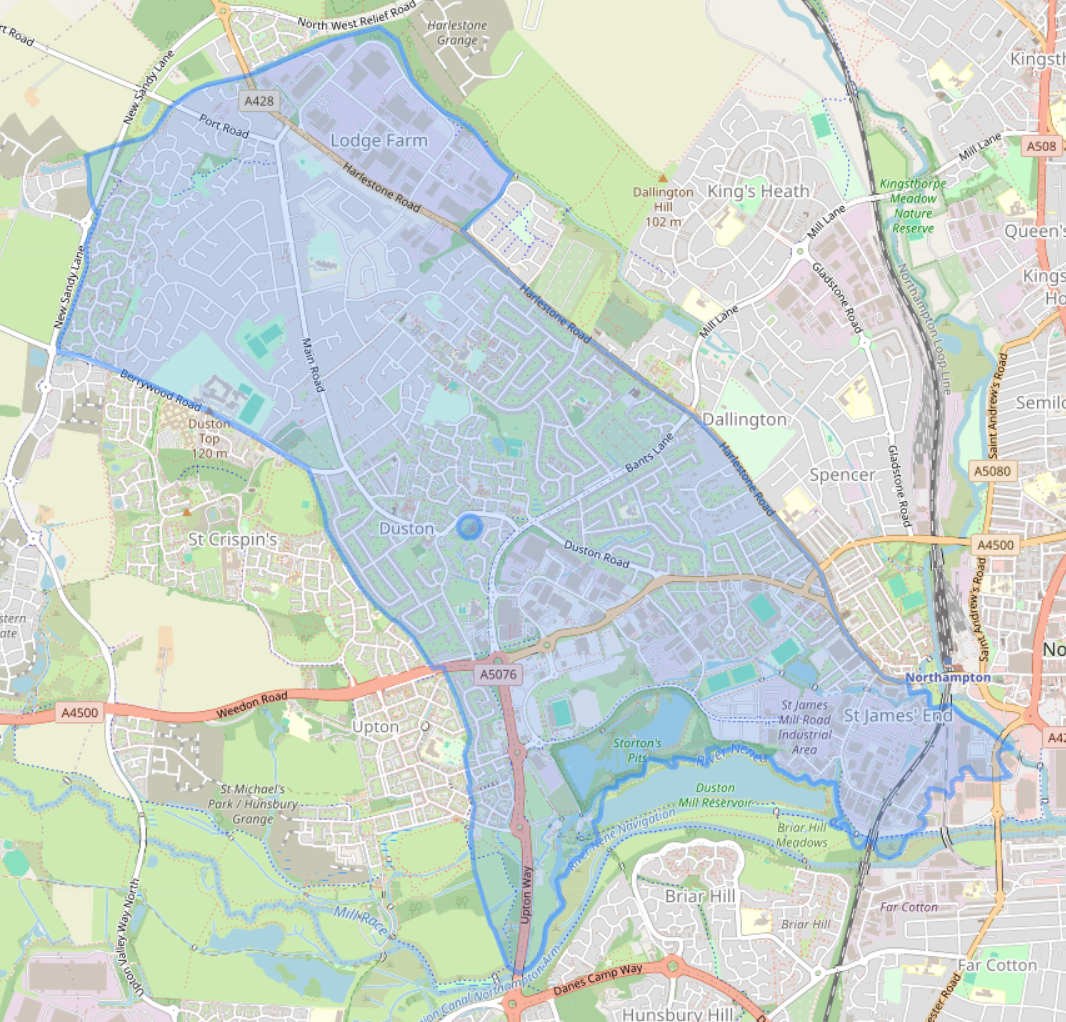
Duston ancient parish boundaries (the blue circle marks the location of St Luke's Church)

Part of the limestone quarry was incorporated into the British Timken site in 1941, when a "shadow factory" was built in 1941 on a green-field site in Main Road, Duston, to produce roller bearings for the war effort. At its peak over 4,000 people were employed in the factory, and the company was a major employer in Duston until the site's closure. In 2002 the works were closed and the site cleared for housing with production moving to Poland. The building was demolished a few years later, but the iron gates at the entrance to the works were preserved and still stand on Main Road.

== Present economy ==
Besides shops and a pub in the village area Duston benefits from its proximity to the Sixfields Leisure retail park, which includes a Cineworld cinema and the Sixfields Stadium – home to the Northampton Town Football Club ("the Cobblers") – a Sainsbury's supermarket and several restaurants and pubs. Blacks Leisure Group (owner of Blacks and Millets) is based on an industrial estate on Mansard Close. On the north-eastern side of the area lies the Lodge Farm industrial estate, where major employers include builders merchants Travis Perkins, XPO Logistics, and a Debenhams distribution centre.

== Education ==
There are a mixture of both secondary and primary schools in Duston. In addition to the secondary school, there are five primary schools located within the Duston boundary. Duston Eldean Primary School lies between the northern section of Main Road and Firsview Drive. Millway Primary School is situated in the south-eastern end of the parish on Millway near to the Sixfields retail park and Stadium. Hopping Hill Primary School is another community primary school, situated on Pendle Road close to the Duston Library and Limehurst Square shopping precinct. Chiltern Primary School is positioned on the north-east of the area on Chiltern Way. The St Luke's CEVA Primary School, while connected to the St Luke's church on Main Road, is actually located outside of Duston and instead in the neighbouring St Crispin area.

There is one all-through school in the civil parish, The Duston School, located towards the south-western end on Berrywood Road. Formerly named Duston Upper School prior to the abolition of middle schools in Northamptonshire, the school is co-educational and serves a teaching school for student teachers. In addition to its 4-16 provision, the Duston School also contains a small sixth form centre offering A-Levels, BTECs and other vocational courses. Outside of the parish, there are a number of nearby schools parents may send their children to in Northampton and the villages. The fee paying Quinton House School is located nearby in the Upton area, directly south of Duston.

== Gallery ==
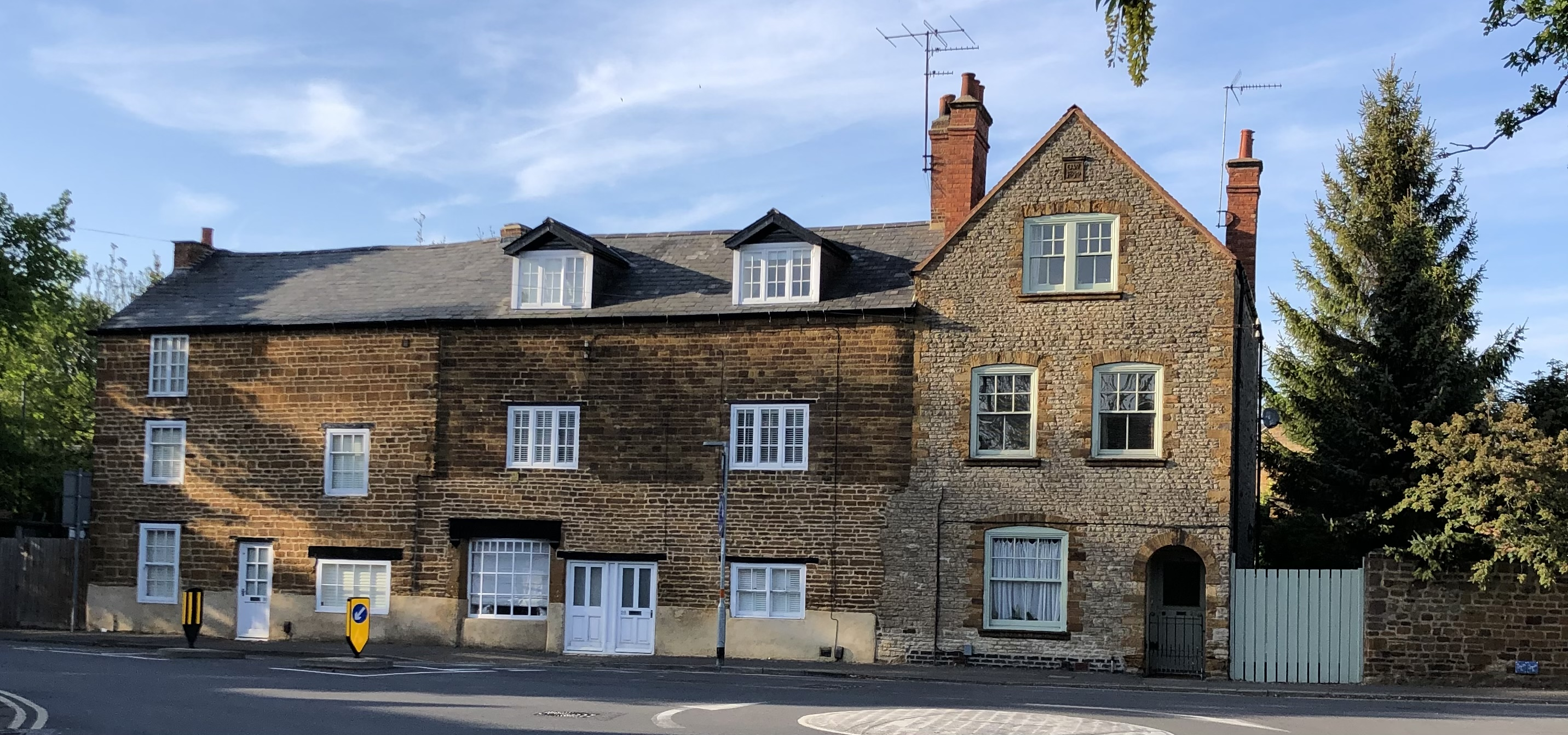
Houses in Duston village (2019)

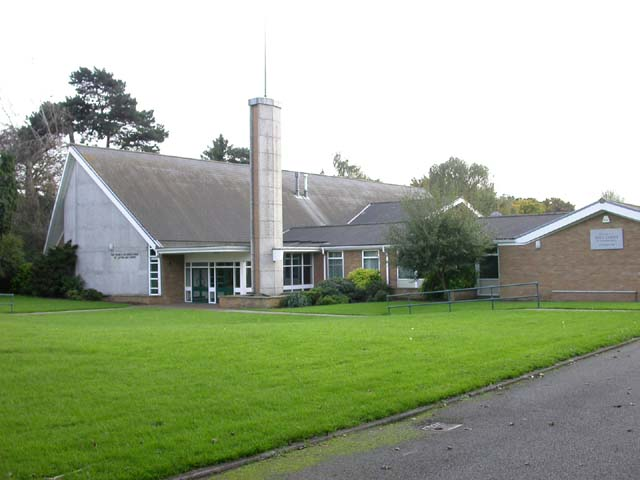
The Church of Jesus Christ of Latter-Day Saints (2006)
