= Abbeyfield School, Northampton =

Abbeyfield School

Location
- Mereway; Northampton, Northamptonshire, NN4 8BU; England; 52°12′54″N 0°54′12″W

Information
- Type: Academy
- Established: 1 October 2012
- Founder: CET (Creative Education Trust)
- Department for Education URN: 138858 Tables
- Ofsted: Reports
- Principal: Fiona Aris
- Gender: Mixed
- Age: 11 to 18
- Website: http://www.abbeyfieldschool.org.uk/

Abbeyfield School is a mixed secondary school and sixth form located in Northampton in the English county of Northamptonshire.

It was previously known as Mereway Upper School which had an intake of 13- to 18-year-olds. Due to school reorganisation in Northamptonshire in 2004 the school expanded its intake to 11-year-olds to become a full secondary school, and it was renamed Mereway Community College. The school moved into a new building in 2008 and was renamed Abbeyfield School. In October 2012, the school was converted to academy status sponsored by the Creative Education Trust.

Abbeyfield School offers GCSEs and BTECs as programmes of study for pupils, while sixth form students can choose to study from range of A Levels and further BTECs.
