= Wootton, Northamptonshire =

Area of Northampton, England

Coordinates: 52.20066°N 0.88569°W

Wootton
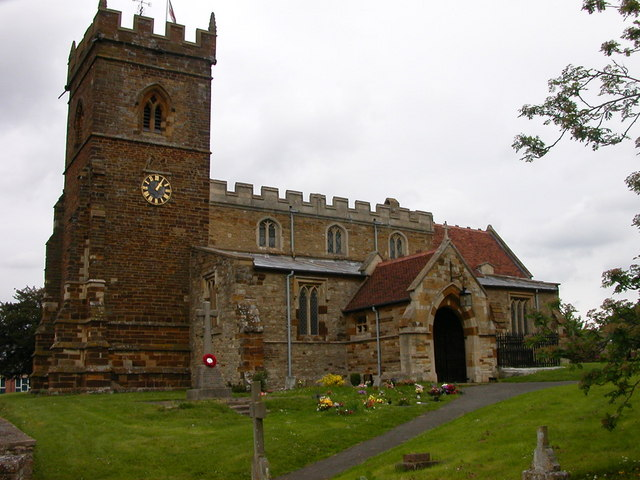
- Church of St George the Martyr

- Location within Northamptonshire
- Population: 11,180 (Nene Valley Ward)
- OS grid reference: SP762564
- Civil parish: Wootton
- Unitary authority: West Northamptonshire
- Ceremonial county: Northamptonshire
- Region: East Midlands
- Country: England
- Sovereign state: United Kingdom
- Post town: Northampton
- Postcode district: NN4
- Dialling code: 01604
- Police: Northamptonshire
- Fire: Northamptonshire
- Ambulance: East Midlands
- UK Parliament: South Northamptonshire

Wootton is a former village about 3 miles (4.8 km) south of Northampton town centre that is now part of Northampton. It is a civil parish in the West Northamptonshire district, in the ceremonial county of Northamptonshire, England.

Wootton is separated from Hardingstone by the Newport Pagnell Road the B526, formerly part of the A50 road. Part of Wootton is alongside the A45 dual carriageway from the M1 to Wellingborough which is seen and heard from that part of the area.

== History ==
=== Domesday Book ===
In the Domesday Book of 1086, Wootton is described as "Wetone". It later became Weton, Wutton and then Witton. "Wootton" appeared in the 14th century. The names probably have the Saxon origin of "Wudutun" and mean settlement or farmstead in, or by, a wood, which may have been Salcey Forest.

=== Church ===
The 13th-century Parish Church of St George the Martyr stands in the High Street in a conservation area, and is a Grade I listed building. It was restored in 1865. It was again restored and re-dedicated in 1991 after a £93,000 restoration programme had been successfully completed.

The Rectory, west of the church is dated 1630. A memorial in the south wall is to the wife of John Harris, the Lord of the manor in the 18th century.

=== 17th and 18th centuries ===
Little of Wootton dates from earlier than Stuart times. Most of the stone houses are late 17th or early 18th century. Many of these houses were originally thatched, as can be seen from the steep pitch of the roof.

Wootton Inclosure Act 1778
- Act of Parliament
- Parliament of Great Britain
- Long title: An Act for dividing, allotting and enclosing, the Open and Common Fields, Common Pastures, Common Meadows, and other Commonable Lands and Grounds, of and within the Parish and Liberties of Wootton, in the County of Northampton.
- Citation: 18 Geo. 3. c. 100 Pr.
- Territorial extent: Great Britain

Dates
- Royal assent: 15 May 1778
- Commencement: 20 November 1777 (Note: Start of session.)
- Repealed: 15 November 1988
Other legislation
Repealed by	Northampton Act 1988

Status: Repealed

Many brick cottages are at least as old with those in Church Hill, at least 1770s, as they are mentioned in the Wootton Inclosure Act 1778 (18 Geo. 3. c. 100 Pr.). Wootton had its own brick works along Berry Lane. A nearby field was known as Clay Pit field as late as 1932, but even in 1899, it was known as the "Old" Brick Works and used for many years as an ash tip. The Department of the Environment listed Carey's Cottage in Berry Lane as 16th century.

=== 19th century ===
There is some documentary evidence that there was a short-lived attempt to extract iron ore at Wootton in a field "at the back of the workhouse." The ore was probably taken to Bridge Street Station at Northampton by horse and cart. The report is in the Northampton Mercury for 24 January 1852. It implies that the quarrying began some time in 1851 (the same year that quarrying for iron began at Blisworth). It is likely that this was a trial which resulted in the quarry opened at Hardingstone later in 1852. The Hardingstone quarry was a few hundred yards to the east on the other side of Newport Pagnell Road. This is one of the earliest written reports of iron ore extraction in Northamptonshire.

=== Royal Pioneer Corps ===
The Northamptonshire Regiment and later Royal Pioneer Corps were stationed at the former Quebec Barracks, later renamed Simpson Barracks on a large site adjacent to the Newport Pagnell Road which include the old Hardingstone workhouse building which dates from 1839.

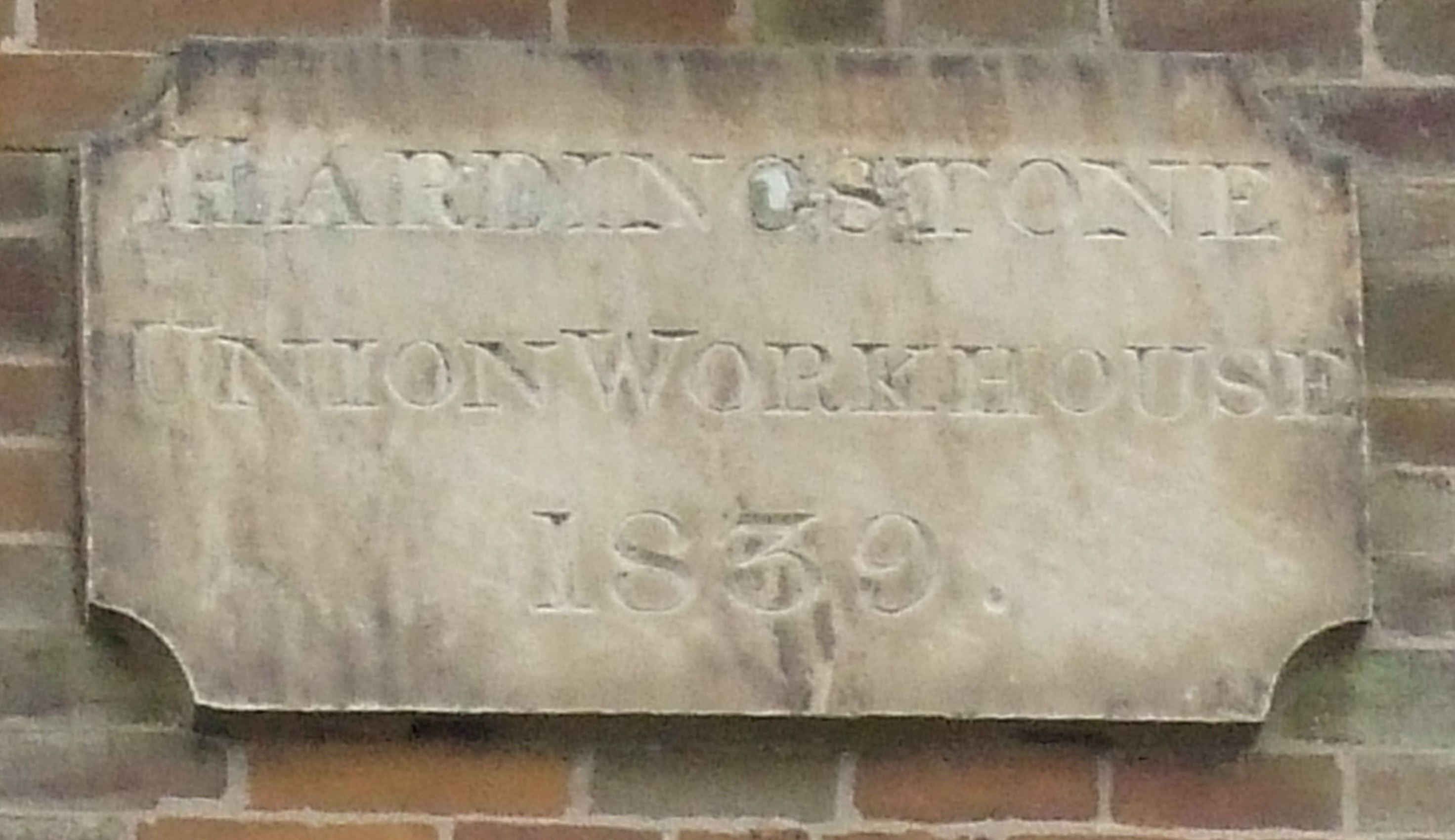
Stone on the former Hardingstone Workhouse building, now Regency Place, Wootton, Northampton

The Barracks closed on 1 April 1993 and the site is now used for a housing estate, including the old workhouse, many road names reflecting its military origin. During the war the corps had an ammunition dump hidden in woods at Yardley Chase, where signs still remain.

=== 1980s urban expansion ===
The village backs on to several modern housing estates including Wootton Fields and the area previously occupied by the army barracks. The development and loss of village character occurred during the 1980s and 1990s as the town expanded south towards the M1 motorway near junction 15 and is next to the large housing estates of Wootton Fields, Grange Park, Simpson Manor and East Hunsbury.

=== 2008 expansion proposals ===
Further urban expansion of Northampton was being planned in October 2008 with another 13,500 houses and additional infrastructure in the rural areas around Grange Park, Quinton and Preston Deanery.

== Governance ==
As a former village distinct from the town, it has its own Parish Council, unlike more recent 20th- and 21st-century suburbs of the town. In the 20th century the parish was merged with East Hunsbury, a rural area before development in the 1980s. However, the combined Wootton and Hunsbury Parish was demerged again in 2015; the Wootton part initially gaining the name "Wootton, Wootton Fields and Simpson Manor", before it was agreed that this was too much of a mouthful, and the parish was reverted to its original name, Wootton.

The village is mostly in the Nene Valley ward of West Northamptonshire Council, with small parts of the parish in the Hackleton and Grange Park ward.

== Demographics ==
The 2001 census showed there were 2,015 people living in the parish, 978 male, 1,037 female in 885 dwellings. The 2011 Census showed that the ward had expanded rapidly to 11,180. The 2021 census showed that 8,591 people lived in the parish, a rise from the 2011 census figure of 8,376 and the 2001 census figure of 5,563.

== Facilities ==
There is a community centre, a recreation ground with a multi-use games area, a Working men's club; opticians and a medical centre.

Wootton has two pub/restaurants – "The Yeoman of Old England" in the centre of what was the old village. The second, "The Queen Eleanor" together with a Premier Inn hotel are both on Newport Pagnell road near the Queen Eleanor junction of Mereway and the A45. There is a shop, butcher, chemist and a large British Garden Centres Garden Centre in Newport Pagnell Road. Waitrose also said they would like to build a supermarket on the road but this was opposed in a report commissioned by the West Northampton Development Corporation. However, in 2013, plans were approved for a new Waitrose store which was opened by Christmas, 2013.

The village primary school is Wootton County founded in 1873. A modern all-through Caroline Chisholm School for young people aged 4–19 is located on Wooldale Road. The private Northampton High School for girls is located along Newport Pagnell Road.

Northampton	Hardingstone
	Wootton
Collingtree	Grange Park
