= List of churches in Northampton =

The following is a list of churches in Northampton. Presently the list is only comprehensive as regards churches that have their own building. Some defunct and former churches are also included. Non-Trinitarian groups are not included; nor are chapels belonging to other institutions such as schools and hospitals.

Name	Image	Denomination	Built In (circa)	Grid reference	Notes/history
St Mark's, Kingsthorpe		Church of England	1960	SP746646	Built circa 1960. Part of the Kingsthorpe team ministry.
Northampton Church of Christ		Churches of Christ	1980	SP810642	Congregation began 1980. Building opened for worship 1984.
St John the Baptist, Kingsthorpe		Church of England	1100	SP746631	There has been a church on the site since the 12th century. It was extensively rebuilt and restored in the 19th century. It was a dependent chapelry of St Peter's, Northampton, throughout the medieval period, only being raised to the status of a separate parish in 1850. Part of the Kingsthorpe team ministry.
St Aidan's, Kingsthorpe		Roman Catholic	1964	SP749634	Built in 1964.
Kingsthorpe Baptist Church		Baptist Union (/ Methodist)	1835	SP750633	Congregation founded 1823. Building (Grade II listed) dates from 1835. The church is in the process of forming a Local Ecumenical Partnership (LEP) with Kingsthorpe Methodist Church, which was formed in 1977 from the amalgamation of two previous Methodist churches and had its own building from 1980 to 2016. The LEP is set to start in September 2024. Currently the two churches share a Sunday service but are formally distinct.
St David's, Kingsthorpe		Church of England	1940	SP759633	Built in 1940. Part of the Kingsthorpe team ministry.
Providence Baptist Chapel		Gospel Standard Baptist	1791	SP784630	The church was founded in 1791. It moved to its current building in the suburbs after World War Two.
Duston Chapel		Order of St Leonard		SP716626	Before 2012 the building was occupied by New Duston Free Church, which may or may not be a previous incarnation of the same church. On large-scale Ordnance Survey maps the church is named "Church of the King."
St Francis, Duston		Church of England	1968	SP721620	The church was opened in 1968. It is part of the Duston and Upton team ministry.
Church on the Heath		Church of England / Baptist	1940	SP735626	St Augustine's Church of England church and King's Heath Baptist Church were both built along with the King's Heath estate in the 1940s and 50s. The current LEP has existed since 2016. The Baptist church has been sold, and the congregation meets in a primary school with the intention to renovate and move into the St Augustine's building.
Osborne Road Gospel Hall		Gospel Hall	1895	SP751628	The building previously belonged to Osborne Road Methodist Church. It was built in 1895 and the Methodists ceased to use it around 1979 when the Kingsthorpe Methodist Church building (see above) was built.
Holy Trinity, Balmoral Road		Church of England	1910	SP754625	The church is known as Holy Trinity and St Paul. The building (Grade II* listed) is Holy Trinity only, and was completed circa 1910.
Kingsley Park Methodist Church		Methodist	1899	SP766621	The building (Grade II listed) dates from 1899. Now a worshipping community of Northampton Methodist Church which since 2022 is formally one church meeting on ten sites.
St Matthew's, Northampton		Church of England	1893	SP767621	Built in 1893-1895. Prior to this point services were held in a 'tin tabernacle'.
Broadmead Baptist Church		Baptist Union	1932	SP771627	The church was opened in 1932 and was rebuilt between 2018 and 2021.
St Gregory the Great, Northampton		Roman Catholic	1954	SP773620	A temporary building was used from 1947. The current building was opened in 1954.
St. Alban the Martyr, Northampton		Church of England	1938	SP777629	Consecrated in 1938. Initially a daughter church of St Peter and St Paul, Abington (cf.).
Living Grace Church		Independent		SP785622	Planted in 1932 as an Assemblies of God church. Moved in the 1950s to a site in Adnitt Road. In the 1980s became Abington Christian Centre and later became an independent church. In 2016 sold the building on Adnitt Road in order to meet in Weston Favell Primary School.
Sacred Heart, Weston Favell		Roman Catholic	1976	SP794629	Built in 1976.
Emmanuel LEP		Church of England / Methodist /Baptist	1974	SP796627	The church opened in 1974. In addition to the main church building in Weston Favell, the Emmanuel Group has two church plants (Boothville Community Church and Rectory Farm Community Church), founded in the mid-1990s, which do not have their own building.
St Andrew's, Great Billing		Church of England	1100	SP808629	A medieval parish church. In a united benefice with Little Billing.
Our Lady of Perpetual Succour, Great Billing		Roman Catholic	1878	SP811628	Mass was said in the chapel at Billing Hall from 1874. The current building was erected in 1878.
Great Billing Methodist Church		Methodist	1841	SP811626	Built in 1841. Now a worshipping community of Northampton Methodist Church which since 2022 is formally one church meeting on ten sites.
Greek Orthodox Church of St Neophytos the Recluse, Northampton		Greek Orthodox Archdiocese of Thyateira and Great Britain		SP714612	Greek Orthodox services were held in All Saints' church from 1968, then in St Peter's, Marefair, from 1973. In 1998 the former hospital chapel of Princess Marina Hospital (built 1887) was bought and consecrated for services.
St Patrick's, Duston		Roman Catholic	1953	SP721613	Services begun 1941; first church built 1953; rebuilt 1994.
Duston URC		United Reformed	1844	SP721611	Originated as a mission of College Lane Baptist Church with services first held for adults 1837; first building erected 1844. Constituted as an independent church 1923.
St Luke's, Duston		Church of England	1100	SP724610	A medieval parish church dating from the 12th century.
St Andrew's Methodist Church, Duston		Methodist	1950	SP730619	Built post-WW2. Now a worshipping community of Northampton Methodist Church which since 2022 is formally one church meeting on ten sites.
St Mary's, Dallington		Church of England	1100	SP737618	A medieval parish church, with the chancel rebuilt in 1883. Grade II* listed.
Spencer Bridge Road Gospel Hall		Gospel Hall		SP743610	Began in 1965 as a plant from Duke Street Gospel Hall. Acquired its own building 1978-1979 (building formerly the St James Church Institute).
Cathedral Church of St Mary and St Thomas, Northampton		Roman Catholic	1825	SP752616	Services began 1823; first chapel built 1825 on current site; new church built 1844, extended 1864 and again in 1948-1955. Mother church of the Roman Catholic Diocese of Northampton.
Miracle Church of God in Christ, Northampton		Church of God in Christ		SP751615	The Northampton site of a multi-site Bedford church which began in 1961.
Duke Street Evangelical Church		FIEC	1870	SP756612	Founded c. 1870 as an Open Brethren church.
Polish Catholic Church of SS Stanislaus & Lawrence		Roman Catholic	1878	SP757612	The building (Grade II* listed) was originally built in 1878-79 as St Lawrence the Martyr (Church of England). Since c. 1980 it has been used as a Polish Catholic church.
Mount Pleasant Baptist Church		Baptist Union	1887	SP763613	Church founded 1873; joined Baptist Union 1881; present building opened 1887.
St Michael and All Angels with St Edmund, Northampton		Church of England	1881	SP764613	Built 1881-1882. Grade II listed.
The Entrance Of The Theotokos Into The Temple Romanian Orthodox Church		Romanian Orthodox		SP764613	Meets in St Michael's church.
Queensgrove Methodist Church		Methodist	1879	SP761610	Begun in 1879. Originally Kettering Road Primitive Methodist Church. Merged with Queens Road Wesleyan Methodist Church in 1960 and name changed to Queensgrove. Now a worshipping community of Northampton Methodist Church which since 2022 is formally one church meeting on ten sites.
Abington Avenue URC		United Reformed		SP769617	In 1901 the congregation of King Street Chapel in the town centre (which originated in 1776 as a breakaway group from Castle Hill church) moved to a site in Abington. Temporary buildings were used until the current building, by Sutton & Gregory, was opened in 1911. Named Abington Avenue Congregational Church, it joined the URC in 1972.
Park Avenue Methodist Church		Methodist	1925	SP772619	Built in 1925.
Christ Church, Abington		Church of England	1906	SP771612	Consecrated in 1906.
SS Peter & Paul, Abington		Church of England	1100	SP775614	A medieval parish church, rebuilt except for the tower in 1821. Now stands in the middle of Abington Park.
St Peter's, Weston Favell		Church of England	1100	SP788618	A medieval parish church.
All Saints, Little Billing		Church of England	1100	SP804617	A medieval parish church. In a united benefice with Great Billing.
St James, St James End		Church of England	1868	SP742606	Built in 1868-1871. The tower was completed in 1924.
Castle Hill (Doddridge) URC		United Reformed	1695	SP749605	Northampton's oldest Nonconformist church. The congregation was established in 1662; the building (Grade II listed) dates from 1695.
New Testament Church of God House of Prayer, Northampton		New Testament Church of God	1863	SP753605	The building (Grade II listed) dates from 1863. It was previously occupied by College Street Baptist Church (see below).
The Holy Sepulchre, Northampton		Church of England	1100	SP753609	One of only four surviving medieval round churches in England; one of the four medieval parish churches in Northampton that survived into the 19th century. Grade I listed, it was probably built by Simon de Senlis, Earl of Northampton circa 1100, making it the oldest building in the town.
All Saints, Northampton		Church of England	1680	SP754604	A medieval church (one of the four medieval parish churches that survived into the 19th century), largely rebuilt in 1680 after the Great Fire of Northampton. Grade I listed.
St Giles, Northampton		Church of England	1200	SP759605	A medieval church (one of the four medieval parish churches that survived into the 19th century).
Northampton Quaker Meeting		Quaker	1800	SP757607	The building has been used for Quaker meetings since the early 19th century.
Wesleyan Holiness Church, Northampton		Wesleyan		SP760609	Meets in the building that formerly belonged to St Gabriel's (see below).
New Covenant Church Northampton		Independent	1897	SP761608	Meets in a building which was built in 1897 as a Unitarian church and remained as such until 2000.
Victoria Road Congregational Church		Congregational Federation	1873	SP762606	The church was established in 1873; the current building dates from 1889.
St Mary’s Jacobite Syrian Orthodox Church, Northampton		Jacobite Syrian Orthodox		SP762606	Meets in Victoria Road Congregational Church.
St Mary's, Far Cotton		Church of England	1887	SP749592	The parish was established in 1875, but the church was not completed until 1887, with the tower added in 1902.
Towcester Road Methodist Church		Methodist	1924	SP750593	The church began in 1863, with a new chapel built in 1888 and the current building erected in 1924. (The 1888 chapel was used by the Salvation Army but demolished in the 1970s.)
St Benedict's, Hunsbury Hill		Church of England	1982	SP733585	Built in 1982.
The Abbey Centre Baptist Church, East Hunsbury	1987	Baptist Union		SP742580	Alma Road Baptist Church began 1856 in Far Cotton; first building 1860; new building on Abbey Road 1895; relocated to new building in East Hunsbury 1987.
SS Francis & Therese, East Hunsbury		Roman Catholic	1980	SP741579	Presumably built in the 1980s with the rest of the Hunsbury estate.
St Edmund's, Hardingstone		Church of England	1200	SP763578	A medieval parish church.
St George the Martyr, Wootton		Church of England	1200	SP762565	A medieval parish church.

== Former churches ==
Name	Image	Denomination	Grid reference	Notes/history
St Crispin's		Church of England		Opened in 1884. Now closed.
Headlands URC		United Reformed	SP783630	Began as a Congregational church in 1944. This church closed in 2021.
Weston Favell Methodist Church		Methodist	SP789621	The exterior has "Wesleyan Chapel 1853" inscribed on a stone. The Methodist Church building is no longer used now that the Methodist church is part of the Emmanuel LEP.
St Paul's, Semilong		Church of England	SP752618 (approx)	Opened in 1877. This church has now closed and disappeared and its name merged with Holy Trinity. The name survives in St Paul's Road, Semilong.
St Lawrence the Martyr		Church of England	SP757612	Opened in 1879. Now closed and used as a Polish Catholic church (see above).
St Bartholomew's or St Lawrence's		Church of England	SP753614	In use from the early 12th century until approximately 1520. The site is now occupied by The Poplars funeral home.
St Michael's, Upton		Church of England	SP717602	Originally a private chapel to Upton Hall; a chapel of ease to St Peter's (see below) until 1966; closed for regular worship in 1980 and now under the care of the Churches Conservation Trust.
Doddridge Memorial URC, St James		United Reformed	SP743605	Demolished in 1998. The adjoining church hall and Sunday school rooms are now a community centre called the Doddridge Centre.
St Peter's Church, Northampton		Church of England	SP749603	A medieval church (one of the four medieval parish churches that survived into the 19th century). Closed in 1995 and now in the care of the Churches Conservation Trust. Grade I listed.
Scarletwell Methodist Mission		Methodist	SP749607	Begun in 1840 and continued until 1958.
St Andrew's, Northampton		Church of England	SP750608	Built in 1842 to cater for the rapidly expanding population of The Boroughs. Demolished in the early 1970s.
St Katherine's, Northampton		Church of England	SP752605	Built in 1839, demolished 1950. The site is now partially occupied by St Katherine's Gardens.
St John's		Roman Catholic	SP754601	A 15th/16th century building, later used by the Roman Catholics. Now a wedding venue and restaurant.
College Street Baptist Church		Baptist	SP753605	The church was founded in 1697 as College Lane Baptist Church; it became College Street Baptist and had its building rebuilt in classical style in 1863. It has since closed and the building is now occupied by the New Testament Church of God (see above).
Jesus Fellowship Church		Independent	SP759607	Began as Bugbrooke Baptist Church; became a rapidly growing charismatic church 1969; expelled from Baptist Union 1986; bought the former The Deco theatre (built 1936) c. 2000 and rebranded it as the Jesus Centre; disbanded 2019.
St Edmund's, Northampton (Victorian)		Church of England	SP764609	Built in 1846. Located on the current St Edmund's Road, it was demolished c. 1980 and its name merged with St Michael's.
St Edmund's, Northampton (medieval)		Church of England	SP760608	A medieval church which stood on what is now Abington Square. Built in the 12th century to cater for the expansion of the town beyond the medieval walls, it fell out of use when the population later declined during the 15th century and has long been demolished. The name was resurrected for a Victorian church (see above).
St Gabriel's		Church of England	SP760609	In 1894 an iron church, previously used to house St Matthew’s church in Kingsley Park, was erected. Services stopped in 1925. The building now belongs to the Wesleyan Holiness church (see above).
Hardingstone Baptist Church		Baptist	SP766578	The Baptist church was erected in 1857 and has since closed.
