= St. Alban the Martyr, Northampton =

Church in Northampton, England

St Alban the Martyr, Northampton
- Church of St Alban the Martyr
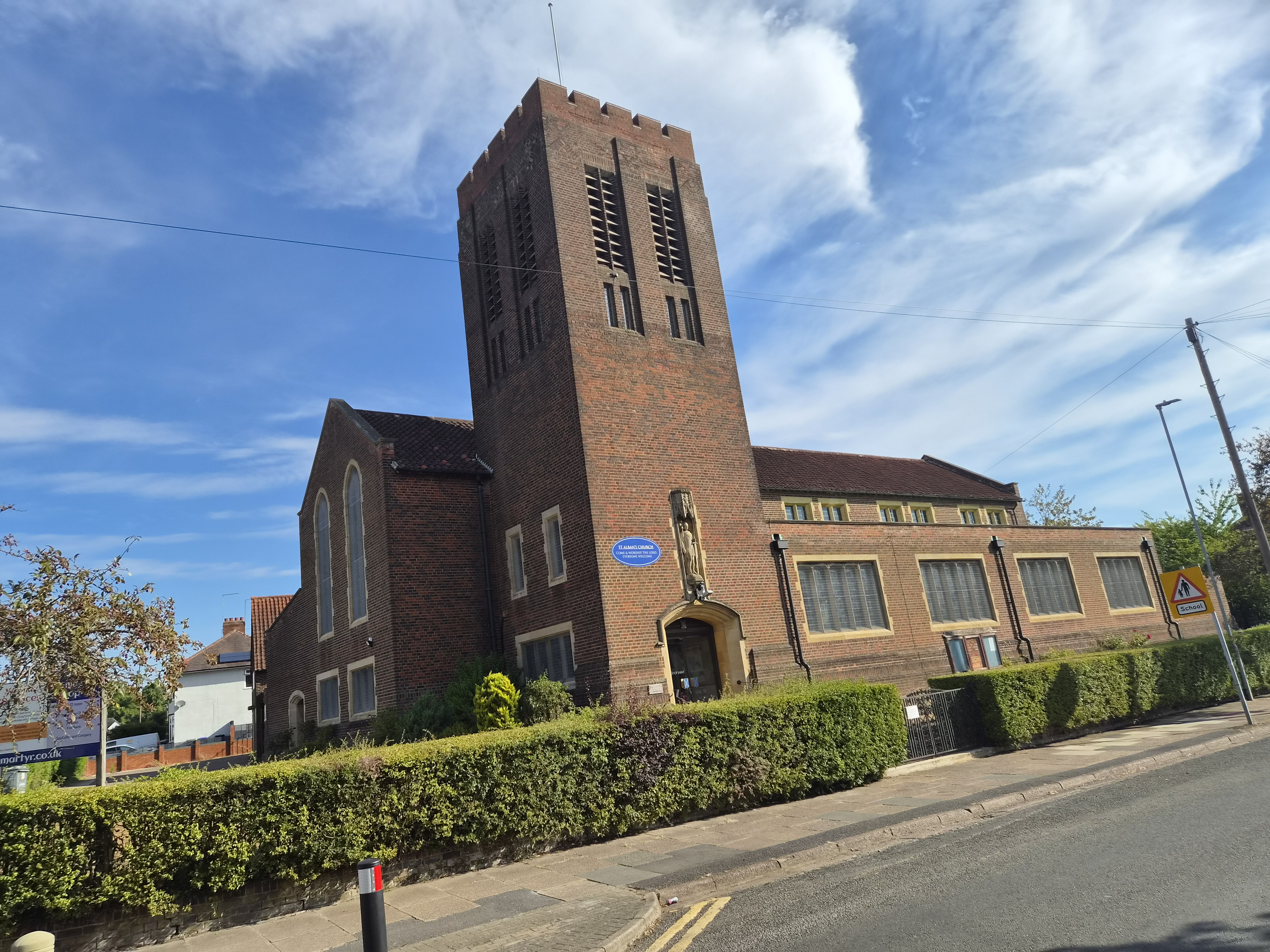
- St. Alban the Martyr, Northampton in 2026
- St Alban the Martyr, Northampton
- 52.259153°N 0.863189°W
- OS grid reference: SP 777 629
- Location: Broadmead Avenue, Spinney Hill, Northampton
- Country: England
- Denomination: Church of England
- Website: www.stalbanthemartyr.co.uk

History
- Status: Active
- Dedication: Saint Alban
- Consecrated: 1938

Architecture
- Functional status: Parish church
- Heritage designation: Not designated
- Architect: William Henry Randoll Blacking
- Style: Neo-Tudor, with Renaissance detail

Administration
- Province: Canterbury
- Diocese: Peterborough
- Archdeaconry: Northampton
- Parish: Northampton: St Alban the Martyr

St Alban the Martyr is a Church of England parish church in Broadmead Avenue, Northampton, Northamptonshire, England. Built to serve the Spinney Hill housing estate on the eastern edge of the town, it was designed by the church architect William Henry Randoll Blacking (1889–1958) and consecrated in 1938. The building is not a listed building.

== History ==
Northampton expanded rapidly in the late nineteenth and early twentieth centuries, and a succession of new Anglican churches was built to serve the growing suburbs. St Alban's, in Broadmead Avenue, was among the twentieth-century additions, following earlier foundations such as Christ Church (1907) and Holy Trinity (1908) and preceding St Augustine's, King's Heath.

The church stands within the Spinney Hill estate in eastern Northampton, which was laid out at about the same time as the church was built, and the building is broadly contemporary with the surrounding housing. It was consecrated in 1938. A parish history covering the church's first seventy years was published locally in 2008.

== Architecture ==
St Alban's was designed in a neo-Tudor manner, and its fittings were also designed by Blacking. Externally the church is of plain brick, with a broad tower placed off centre; the brickwork can appear purple in some lights. The interior is light, with a hammerbeam roof painted white.

The nave is separated from the chancel by a tall wooden screen in a Renaissance style. It is surmounted by the royal arms of George VI – a late instance of that form of church decoration – above which a Calvary group stands on a broken pediment. The south-east chapel contains a painting of the Last Supper by a French artist, dated 1955, while the north chapel, dedicated to the Blessed Virgin Mary, retains its original fittings.

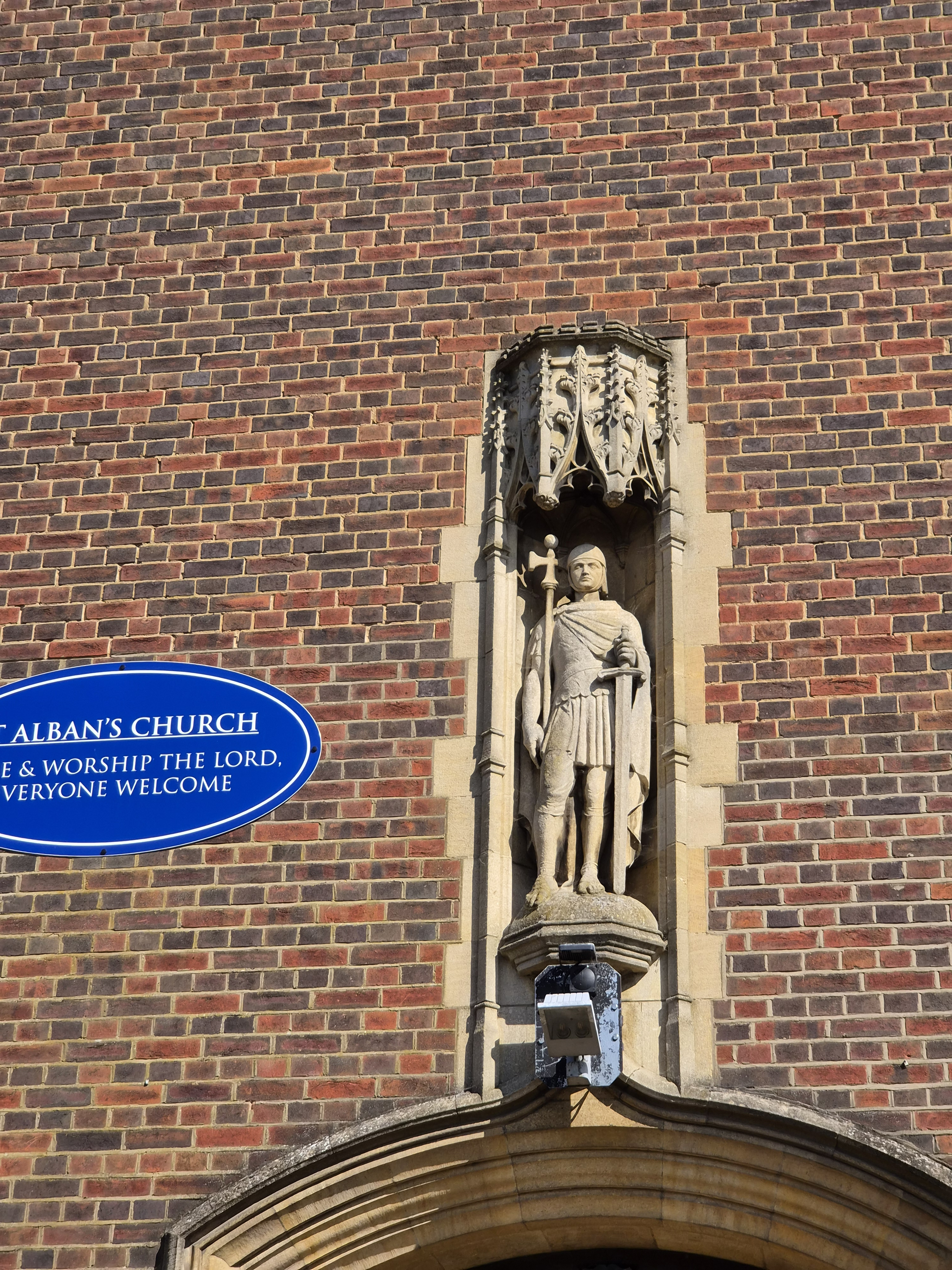
Statue of St Alban above the main door.

The Lady Chapel fittings and the font with its painted cover were supplied by Robert Bridgeman and Sons of Lichfield, a firm founded in 1871 whose ecclesiastical work included commissions at the John Rylands Library in Manchester and at both of Birmingham's cathedrals. Bridgeman's also carved the statue of St Alban set in a niche above the main door.

The church has one bell.

== Parish and present day ==
The parish is styled Northampton: St Alban the Martyr and lies in the Archdeaconry of Northampton within the Diocese of Peterborough. The church is open for worship, with a principal Sunday service of Holy Communion drawing on both the Book of Common Prayer and Common Worship. The parochial church council is a registered charity, and the parish maintains two community halls, the Jubilee Hall and the Parish Hall, which are let for local use.

The church is not a listed building, is not situated in a conservation area, and is not on the Heritage at Risk Register.

== See also ==
- List of churches in Northampton
- Grade II* listed buildings in Northamptonshire
