= Malta Spring Festival =

Music and performing arts festival

The Malta Spring Festival is an annual music and performing arts festival held each spring in Valletta, the capital city of Malta. It is primarily focused on classical and contemporary music, and showcases a mix of orchestral, chamber, and performance works alongside educational initiatives.

== History ==
The Malta Spring Festival was conceived and founded in 2005 by Karl Fiorini, a composer and artistic director. Since its inception, the festival has taken place annually, typically in April, and has grown into one an annual event, attracting international performers and ensembles alongside Maltese musicians. Amongst international guests visiting the festival were Dmitry Sitkovetsky, Hans-Peter Hoffman, Larisa Pominova, Brian Schembri and many others.

From its early years, the festival has curated programmes that explore both well-known and lesser-performed repertoire, juxtaposing established classics with contemporary works. It also emphasises thematic coherence, with each edition centred around an overarching concept that informs programming and artistic direction.

== Format and programming ==
The festival usually runs for several days and features a series of evening concerts, chamber recitals, and multidisciplinary performances incorporating dance and other art forms. Events are hosted in a variety of historic venues across Valletta, including Teatru Manoel and St Paul's Anglican Pro-Cathedral. Apart from the events, the festival also hosts a series of masterclasses with visiting guests musicians, primarily for string players, but also for other instrumentalists.

Every year, the festival selects a new programming theme, which seeks to contextualise musical works within broader cultural, philosophical, or historical frameworks. Parallel to the main concert series, the festival runs educational initiatives aimed at emerging performers, such as the Rising Stars Concert Series and, more recently, the Malta Spring Festival International Strings Academy.

== Themes ==
The Malta Spring Festival adopts a themed approach for its annual editions. The themes are selected to guide repertoire choices and artistic direction, often engaging with cultural, social, or conceptual ideas. Past themes include:

Themes of the Malta Spring Festival per year
Year	Edition Title	Edition Subject
2017	From Zappa to Beethoven	Explored a wide range of repertoire with reference to the musical influence of the city of Vienna.
2018	Revolution & its Composers	Marked the 50th anniversary of global sociopolitical movements with music reflecting on revolution.
2019	Of Death and Maidens	Engaged with themes of mortality and youth through selected repertoire.
2020	Must it be? It must be!	Celebrated Ludwig van Beethoven's 250th birth anniversary and the enduring impact of his music.
2021	Degenerates	Referenced "Entartete Kunst" and raising questions about censorship, artistic freedom, and modernism.
2022	About Hope	Reflected on resilience, youth, and creative aspiration.
2023	The Island of Nowhere	Inspired by utopian ideas and societal reflection.
2024	Fighting for Hope	Motivated by global unrest and the transformative power of music.
2025	A Radiant Future	Focused on global concerns about humanity's future and emphasising innovation and education.
