= William Scamp =

English architect and engineer

- Born: 5 June 1801; Georgeham, Devon, United Kingdom
- Died: 13 January 1872 (aged 70); United Kingdom
- Resting place: Kensal Green Cemetery, London
- Occupation: Architect
- Employer: Admiralty

William Scamp (5 June 1801 – 13 January 1872) was an English architect and engineer. After working on the reconstruction of Windsor Castle to designs of Sir Jeffry Wyatville, he was employed by the Admiralty from 1838 to his retirement in 1867. Throughout his career of almost three decades, Scamp designed naval facilities in Britain, Malta, Gibraltar and Bermuda.

Scamp's early works from the 1840s include a dockyard and the Royal Naval Bakery in Malta. During his stay in Malta, he oversaw the construction of St Paul's Pro-Cathedral, making significant alterations to the building in the process. His most notable works in Britain were extensions of the Chatham and Portsmouth Dockyards carried out from the 1860s to the 1880s.

== Life ==
Scamp was born on 5 June 1801 in the village of Georgeham in North Devon, and he was the son of a maltster and shipowner. He was interested in geometry and surveying from a young age, and he taught himself since his father's death prevented him from having professional training. His breakthrough came when Jeffry Wyatville noticed his work in a competition entry for the Assembly Halls at Ilfracombe. Scamp subsequently worked with Wyatville, serving as a Clerk of Works during the reconstruction of Windsor Castle for over a decade.

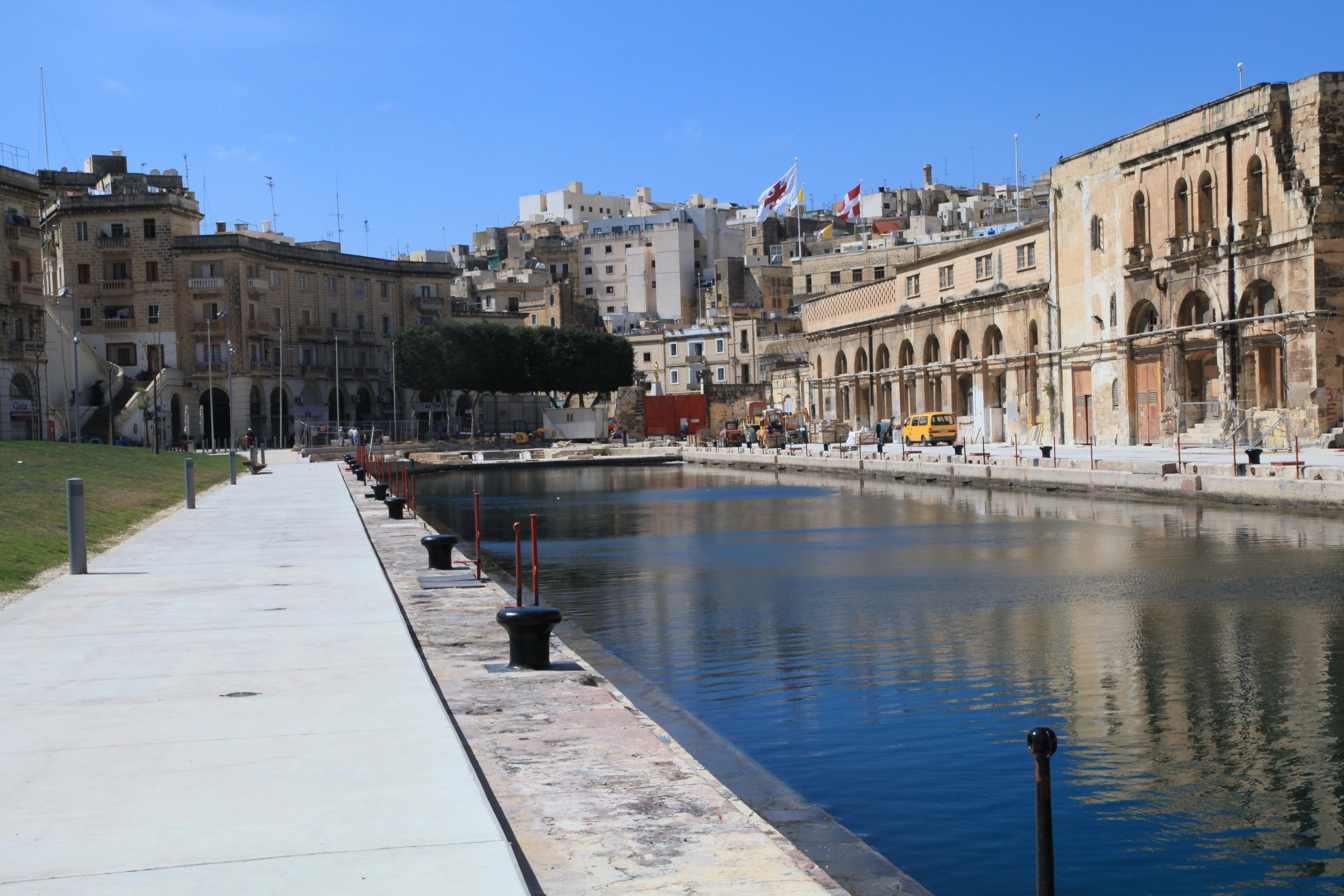
No. 1 Dock in Cospicua, Malta (1844–48)

In 1838, Scamp joined the Admiralty at Woolwich Dockyard. Between 1841 and 1844, he worked on three major projects in Malta: the No. 1 Dock in Cospicua, the Royal Naval Bakery in Birgu and St Paul's Pro-Cathedral in Valletta. Queen Adelaide, who had commissioned the cathedral, presented Scamp with a silver candelabrum as a gratitude for his work upon his return to England. During his stay in Malta, he had a daughter named Adelaide Frances Melita (born 1844) with his partner Harriet Wynder.

In 1845 Scamp was recalled from Malta to take up the position of Chief Assistant to the Director of Admiralty Works. He was subsequently involved in re-equipping naval bases around the British Empire in order to make them suitable for ironclads. By 1860, Scamp was credited with major works at the Admiralty establishments in the colonies of Malta, Gibraltar and Bermuda as well as naval bases in Britain itself, such as Deptford, Woolwich, Sheerness, Portsmouth and Pembroke. He became Deputy Director to G. T. Greene in 1852, which had a role in designing iron-framed structures for the Admiralty in the 1850s.

Scamp was married and had two sons, who predeceased him. He retired in 1867, but later designed a land reclamation project for Morecambe Bay and made plans for improving Lancaster Harbour. He died at the age of 70 on 13 January 1872 from lung congestion after a week-long illness. He was buried at Kensal Green Cemetery in London.

== Works ==
Scamp is credited with designing dockyard facilities in a logical manner, rather than locating buildings wherever space was available. His projects also considered the possibility of further expansion in the future.

=== Malta ===
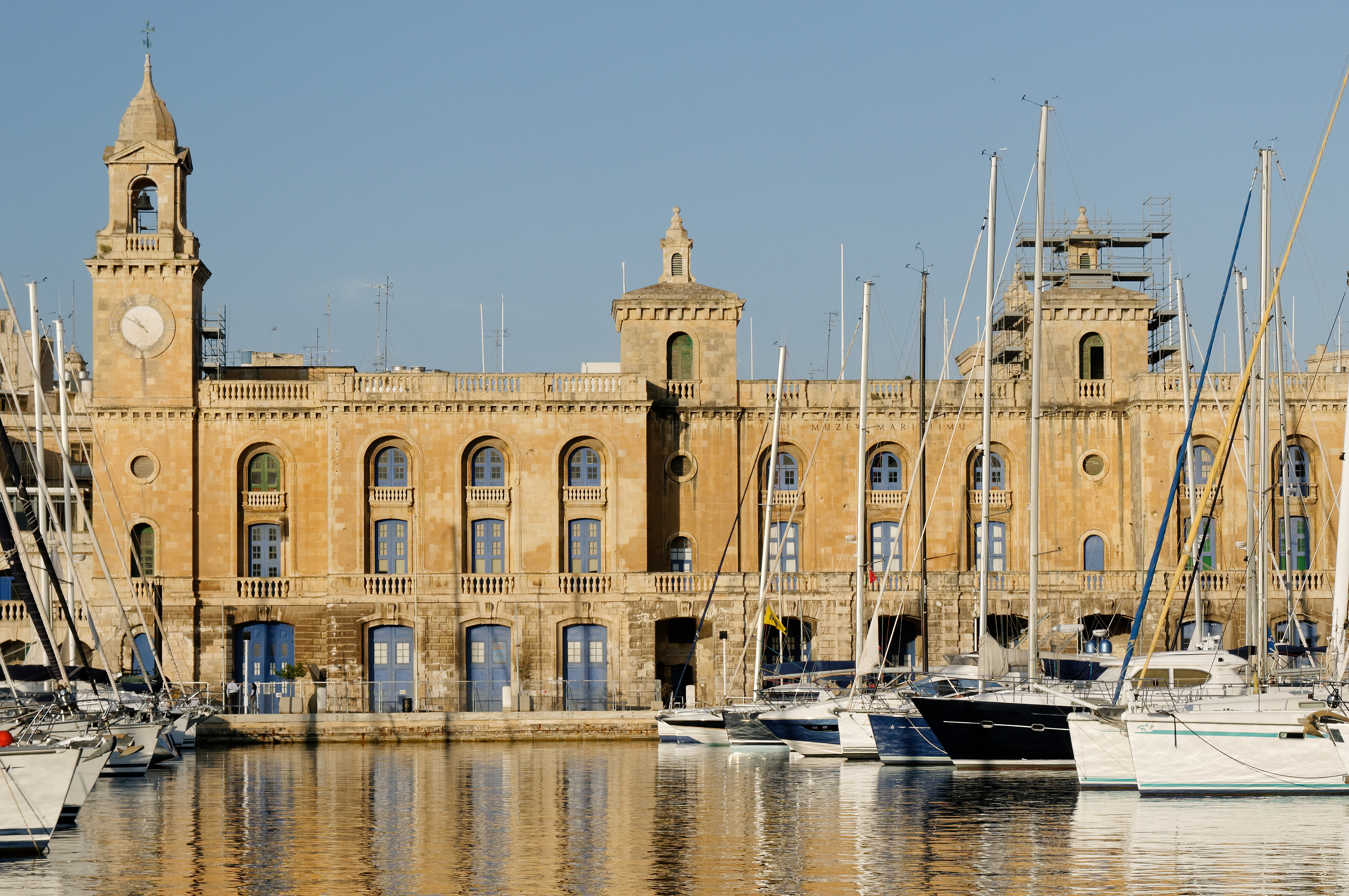
The Royal Naval Bakery in Birgu, Malta (1842–45)

Scamp arrived on Malta in 1841 along with Captain R. E. Brandreth, in order to draw up a report on Malta's dockyard facilities. This was to be a short visit, but Scamp ended up working on the island for three years. Scamp's stay in Malta had significant impact on the island's architectural scene, since he introduced a new form of British colonial architecture which challenged the existing Baroque-inspired traditions which originated from the Hospitaller era.

Scamp decided that the ideal location of the new No. 1 Dock would be in Cospicua, in what is now known as Dockyard Creek. The city's residents were against this plan and protested to the Governor, but works proceeded nonetheless, beginning on 28 June 1844 with the dock being opened on 5 September 1848. Scamp also designed ancillary buildings to the dockyard, some of which were destroyed in World War II. The Royal Naval Bakery in Birgu had been designed by Brandreth, but Scamp made substantial modifications to the plans and the building was constructed on the site of a former galley arsenal between 1842 and 1845. The building was the largest naval bakery located outside of Britain itself, and cast iron was used in its construction, possibly the first time such a building material was used in Malta. Today, the bakery houses the Malta Maritime Museum.

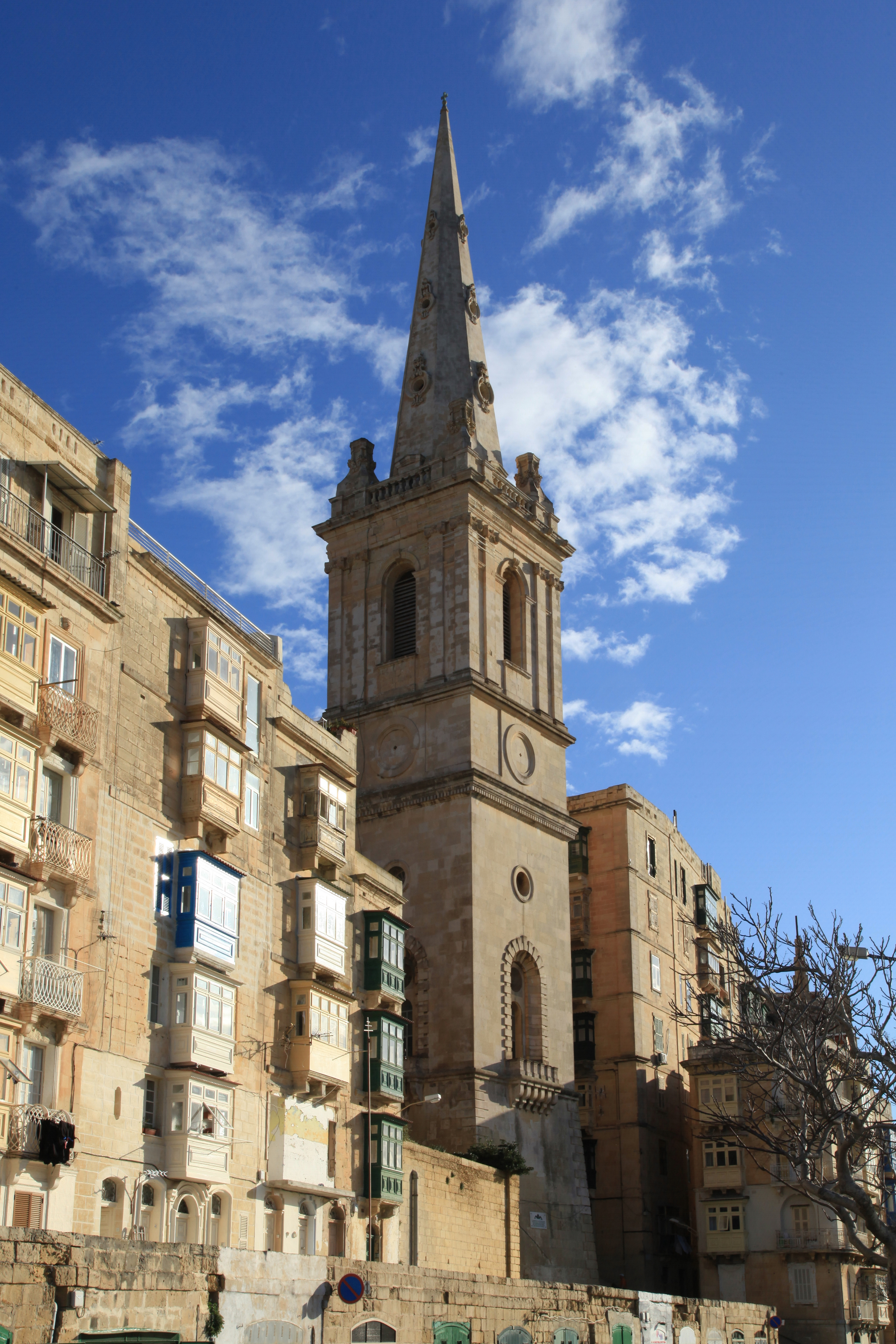
Bell tower of St Paul's Pro-Cathedral, Valletta, Malta (1842–44)

Soon after their arrival in Malta, Scamp and Brandreth were approached by the Building Committee of St Paul's Pro-Cathedral in Valletta to assess structural deficiencies in the building which was then under construction. The cathedral had originally been designed by Richard Lankesheer, and construction had commenced in 1839 before being suspended in 1841 due to structural problems. Lankesheer died suddenly in March 1841, and his death might have been suicide. Scamp oversaw the stabilization works in 1841–42 and the construction of the rest of the cathedral, which was completed in 1844. He made a number of substantial changes to the cathedral's original plans in the process, with his most notable contribution being the design of the bell tower and shifting its position to make it a free-standing structure. The bell tower of the cathedral forms a prominent part of Valletta's skyline. Scamp also designed the cathedral's interior, and he seems to have been inspired by Nicholas Hawksmoor's St Mary Woolnoth church in London. Scamp's intended location for the high altar was altered in accordance with the wishes of Bishop George Tomlinson, although later alterations in the 20th century resulted in a redesign according to Scamp's plans.

Scamp returned to Malta a number of times later on in his career, assisting in extending the Grand Harbour to Il-Menqa in 1860. He was also a consultant in the construction of the Valletta covered market hall and the Asylum for the Insane in Attard.

=== Britain, Gibraltar and Bermuda ===
Scamp's first work were the Assembly Halls at Ilfracombe, which he designed and built after winning a design competition. He also produced many drawings for the Windsor Castle project as Jeffry Wyatville's Clerk of Works.

Notable works in Britain by Scamp while working with the Admiralty include a dry dock at Keyham, two dry docks and ancillary facilities at Devonport, and a tunnel between these two dockyards. After the Crimean War, he designed a hauling-up yard at Haslar Lake near Gosport. He also designed extensions to the Chatham and Portsmouth Dockyards, which were undertaken in 1861–85 and 1867–81 respectively, both projects being completed after Scamp's death.

Scamp also contributed to the naval base at Gibraltar and the Royal Naval Dockyard in Bermuda. Some buildings he designed in Bermuda show similarities to the Naval Bakery he had designed on Malta.
