= St Giles' Church, Northampton =

Church of England building in Northamptonshire

Coordinates: 52°15′08″N 0°52′39″W

St Giles' Church
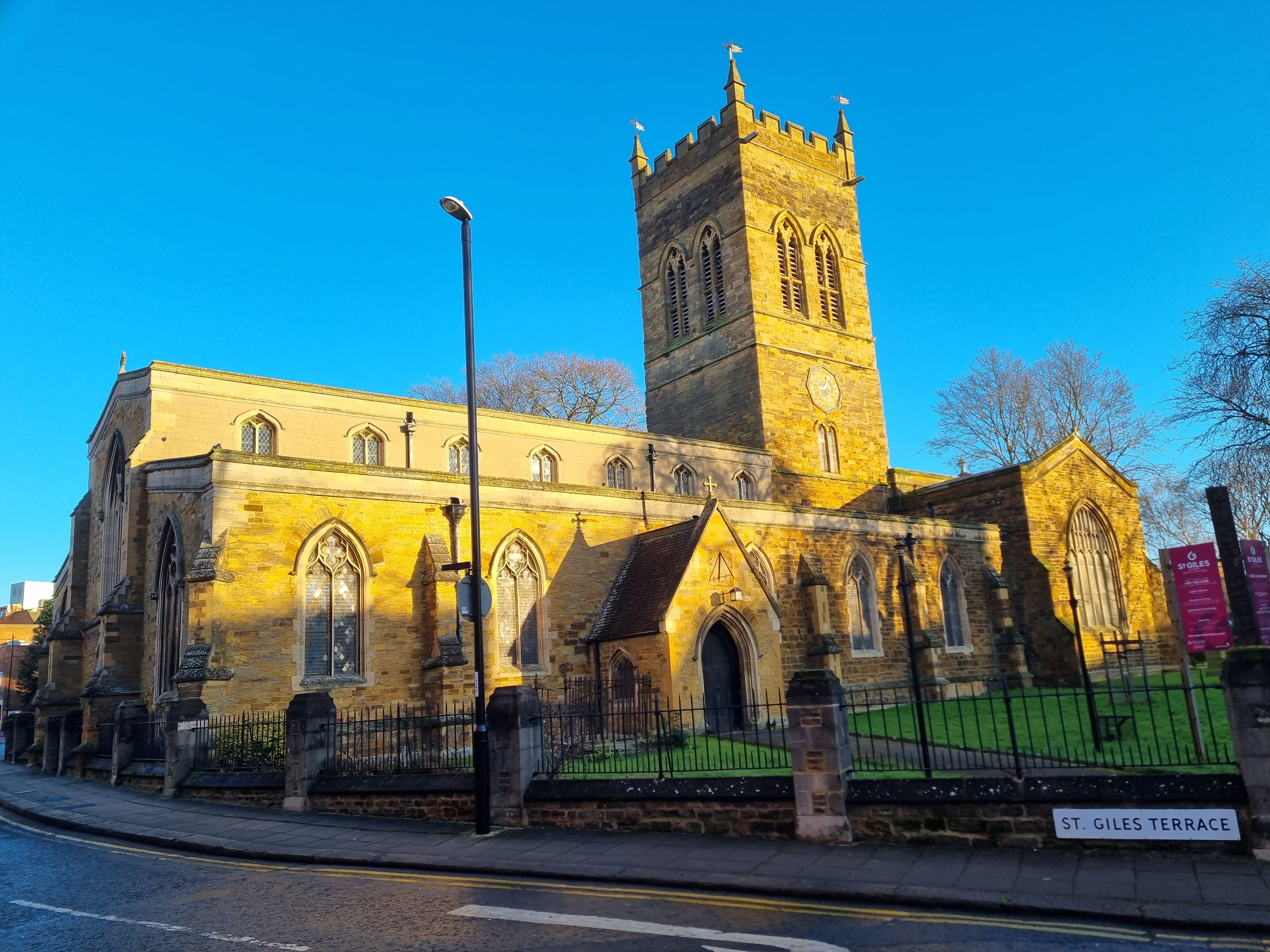
- St Giles' Church, Northampton in 2025
- St Giles' Church
- Country: England
- Denomination: Church of England
- Churchmanship: Evangelical Anglicanism
- Website: Official website

History
- Dedication: Saint Giles

Administration
- Province: Canterbury
- Diocese: Peterborough
- Archdeaconry: Northampton
- Deanery: Greater Northampton
- Parish: Northampton St Giles

Clergy
- Bishop: Right Revd Debbie Sellin
- Vicar: Revd Joshua Thorne

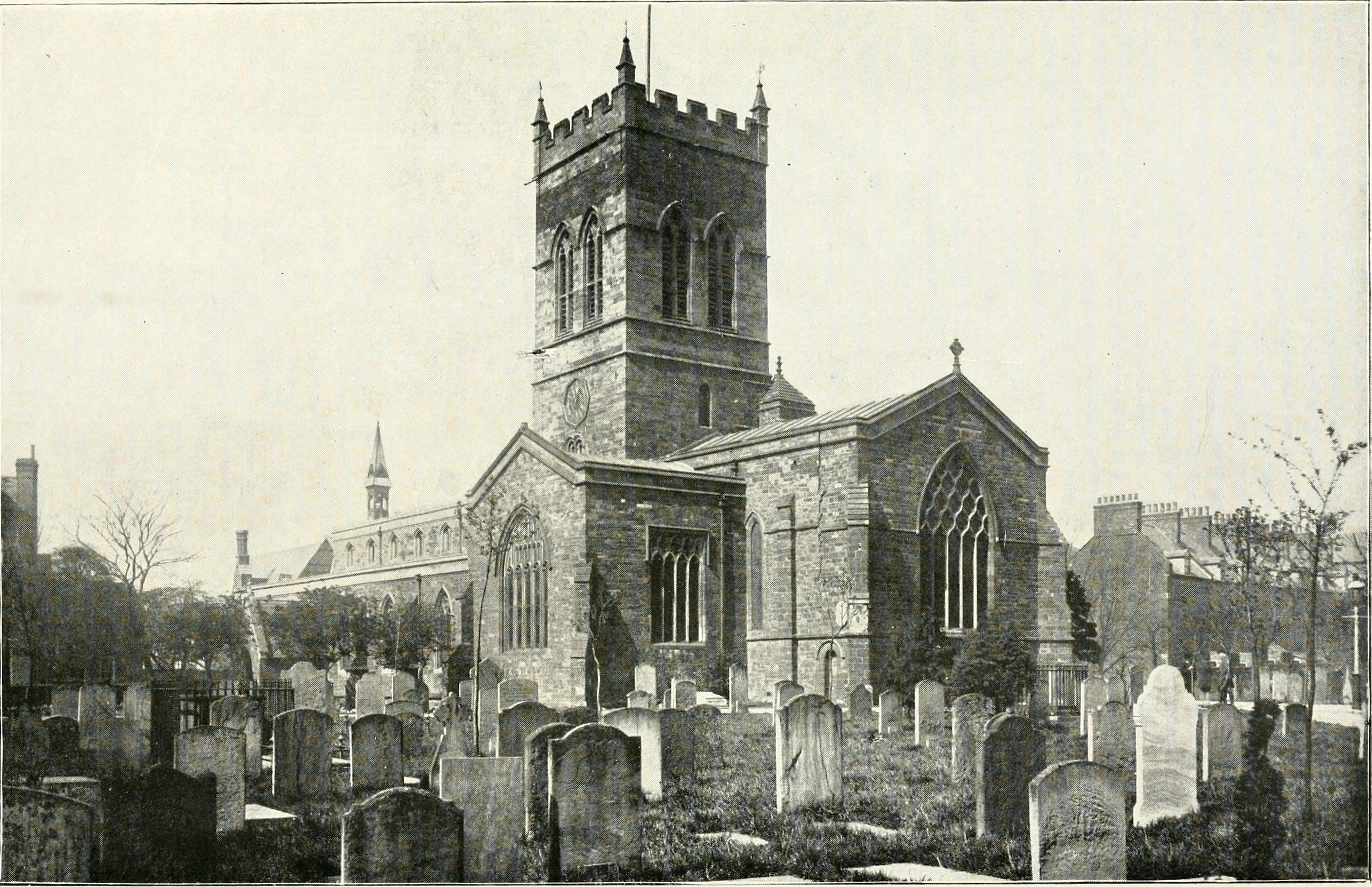
Photograph from A History of the Church of St. Giles, Northampton (1911)

St Giles' Church, Northampton is a Church of England parish church in Northampton, within the Diocese of Peterborough. The church is a Grade I listed building.

The oldest fabric is probably 12th century but the church had a thorough Victorian restoration. The tall crossing tower is 12th century but the upper stages were rebuilt in 1616 after a collapse, and the top was renewed in 1914. The 12th-century west doorway has been reset and restored. The chancel is probably 12th century but later widened, with remains of 13th-century lancet windows. The pulpit is Jacobean. The stained glass in the East window (1878) is by Clayton and Bell.

The Victorian restoration by Edmund Francis Law was based on the 1840 report of George Gilbert Scott whose brother was curate. Law's restoration included an outer north aisle and west end rebuilding with porches, 1853–55. The chancel was restored in 1876.

There is a 15th-century Paynell-Gobion alabaster table tomb and good 17th- and 18th-century wall monuments. James Keill (died 1719) was buried in St Giles', where a monument, with a Latin inscription, was erected. The monument (1743) to Samuel Pennington is by John Hunt. Robert Browne (died 1633) was buried in the churchyard where his monument stands by the south door.

== Patronage ==
Since 1833, when the Rev. Edward Watkin sold the advowson, the patronage has been held by the Simeon trustees, a body with the purpose of acquiring church patronage to perpetuate evangelical Anglican clergy in Church of England parishes.

== Ministers ==
- 1955-1964: Evan Hughes
- 1965-1975: Albert Bransby
- 1975-1996: Peter Gompertz
- 1997-2012: David Bird
- 2013-22: Stephen Kelly
- 2023-: Joshua Thorne

== See also ==
- Grade I listed buildings in Northamptonshire
- List of churches in Northampton
