= All Saints Church, Aldwincle =

Coordinates: 52.4223°N 0.5145°W

All Saints’ Church, Aldwincle
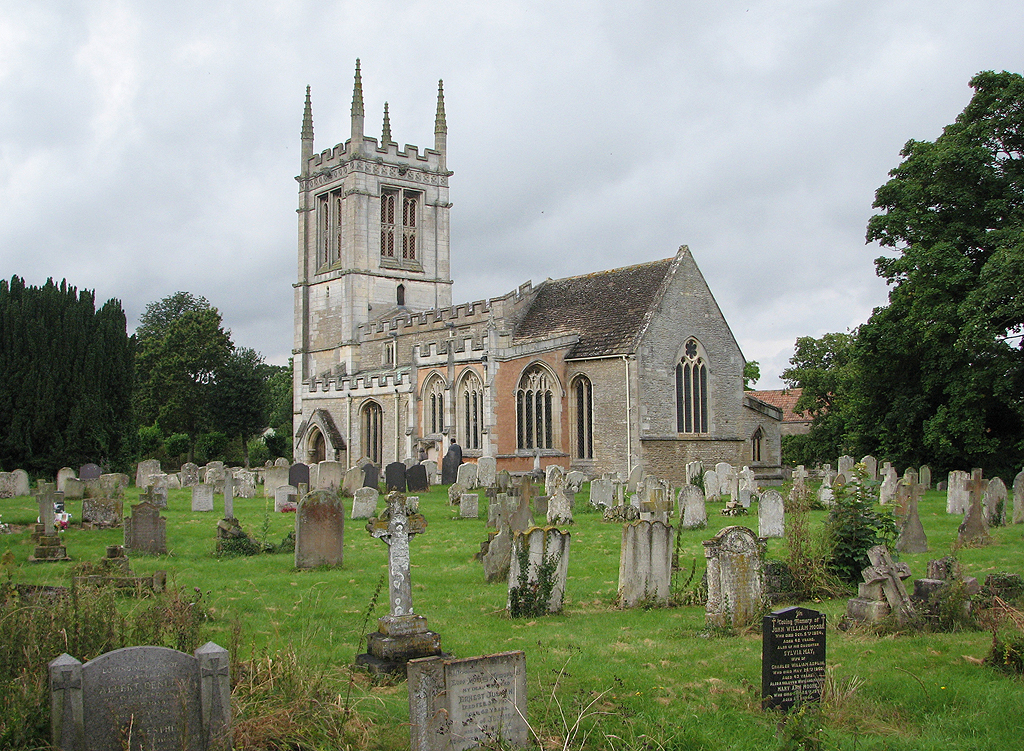
- All Saints’ Church, Aldwincle, from the west

- Location in Northamptonshire
- OS grid reference: TL 011 815
- Location: Aldwincle, Northamptonshire
- Country: England
- Denomination: Anglican
- Website: Churches Conservation Trust

Architecture
- Heritage designation: Grade I
- Designated: 25 May 1967
- Architectural type: Church
- Style: Gothic
- Groundbreaking: 13th century
- Completed: 15th century

Specifications
- Materials: Limestone, Roofs in lead and Collyweston stone slate

All Saints’ Church is a historic Anglican church in the village of Aldwincle, Northamptonshire, England. It is recorded in the National Heritage List for England as a designated Grade I listed building, and is under the care of The Churches Conservation Trust.

== History ==
The church originated in the 13th century. During the next century the north aisle, the vestry and the clerestory were added. In the 15th century the tower, porch and chapel were built. The chapel was a chantry chapel founded by the Chambre family and dates from 1488 to 1489. In 1863 the chancel was restored, followed by the rest of the church in 1893. By this time the parish of All Saints had been united with that of St Peter's, Aldwincle, and All Saints subsequently became disused. It was declared redundant in 1976, and has been made into an architectural museum.

The poet John Dryden was born in the nearby rectory in 1631, and was baptised in the church. Notable rectors include Edward Pierce (from 1663), Thomas Edwards (1707–1721), Thomas Haweis (from 1764, the subject of a great controversy), and Henry Rolls, husband of poet Mary Rolls, who lived at the rectory from 1820 until her death in 1835.

== Architecture ==
=== Exterior ===
All Saints is constructed in limestone, and its roofs are covered partly in lead and partly in Collyweston stone slate. Its plan consists of a nave with a clerestory, north and south aisles, a south porch, a chancel with a chapel to the south and a vestry to the north, and a west tower. The tower is in four stages with buttresses at the corners. The stages are divided by string courses carved with a variety of images. In the lowest stage is a west doorway. Above this, in the second stage and extending into the third stage, is a three-light window. Over this, in the third stage, is a small niche. The top stage is the largest, and is almost completely filled by bell openings on each side. These are square-headed and double, each side containing two lights. Above them is a frieze containing quatrefoils, a battlemented parapet, and a tall crocketted pinnacle at each corner.

The sides of both aisles each contain a doorway and three-light windows, and the clerestory has two square-headed two-light windows on each side. There is a two-light window on the east and west sides of the north aisle, and at the west end of the south aisle. The east window has four lights, and there are two-light windows in the north and south walls of the chancel. The chapel has a four-light east window and two three-light windows in the south wall; all these contain Perpendicular tracery. There also is a doorway in the south wall of the chapel.

=== Interior ===
The arcades are each of three bays with the arches carried on circular piers. There is a piscina in the south wall of the chancel, and brackets for statues on each side of the east window. At the southeast corner of the north aisle is another piscina, this one dating from the 14th century, but it is damaged. There is a third piscina in the chapel. The font is octagonal and dates from the 13th century. The communion rail is Jacobean in style. In the nave there are fragments of a wall painting depicting Saint Christopher. Above the chancel arch is a royal hatchment flanked by the Ten Commandments. In the chancel is a hatchment to the Spinacre family. In the chancel floor is a monumental brass to the memory of William Aldwyncle who died in 1463. On the north wall of the north aisle is a brass commemorating John Pykering, a physician who died in 1659, incorporating an inscription composed by himself. Some of the windows in the church contain medieval stained glass. The church plate includes a cup and paten from about 1570, and two patens from 1861.

== External features ==
In the churchyard are two items designated as Grade II listed buildings. These are a headstone dated 1696, and a chest tomb from the 17th century. At the entrance to the churchyard is a lychgate to the memory of Fanny Satterfield Hodgson who died in 1917.

== See also ==
- Grade I listed buildings in Northamptonshire
- List of churches preserved by the Churches Conservation Trust in the English Midlands
