= John Hunt (sculptor) =

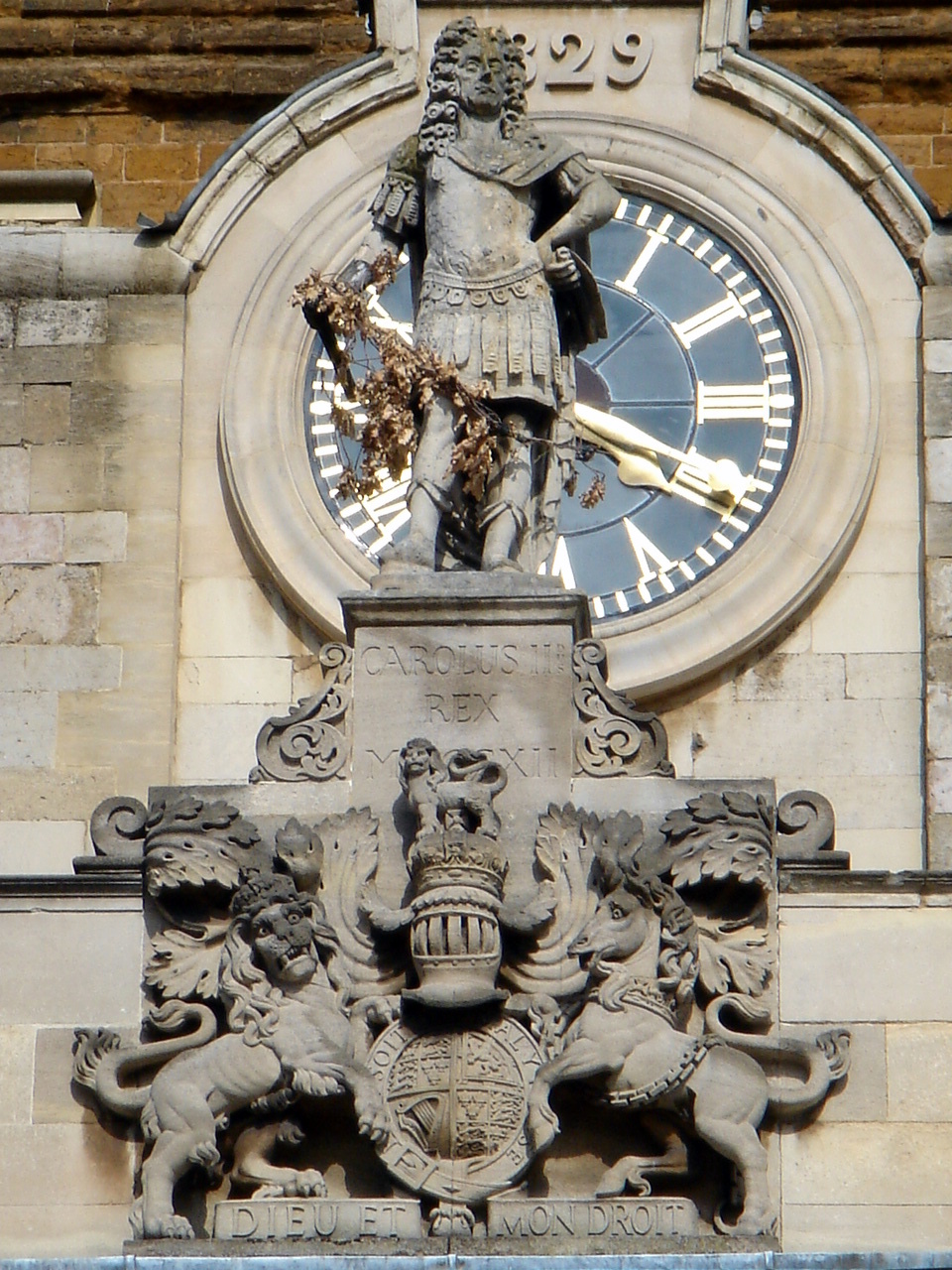
Statue of Charles II on All Saints' Church in Northampton

John Hunt of Northampton (c.1690 – 1754) was an 18th-century sculptor, described as the foremost sculptor in Northamptonshire.

== Life ==
He was born and raised in Northamptonshire, but was sent to London around 1710 to train as a sculptor under Grinling Gibbons.

In 1712, he was created a Freeman Mason of Northampton for donating a statue of King Charles II and other decorations on the frontage of All Saints' Church in that town.

He was found dead in his bed on 25 September 1754.

== Works ==
- Relief panel of Diana on garden frontage of Hinwick House (1710)
- Monument to Sophia Whitwell at Oundle (1711)
- Statue of King Charles II for All Saints' Church, Northampton (1712)
- Monument to Sir William Boughton and Lady Boughton in St Botolph's Church, Newbold-on-Avon (1716)
- Monument to Diana Orlebar at Podington (1716)
- Monument to Frances Stratford at Overstone, Northamptonshire (1717)
- Monument to Edward Stratford at Overstone, Northamptonshire (1721)
- Monument to Samuel Knight at Wellingborough (1721)
- Monument to William Wykes at Haselbech (1721)
- Monument to Sir William Shuckburgh in Lower Shuckburgh (1724)
- Bust of Cilena L'Anson Bradley in Long Buckby church (1726)
- Monument to John Perkens at Kislingbury (1728)
- Monument to Rebecca Ivory at All Saints' Church, Northampton (1728)
- Monument to William Carter at Turvey, Bedfordshire (1728)
- Monument to Benjamin Kidd at All Saints' Church, Northampton (1731)
- Monument to Richard Cumberland at Peakirk (1731)
- Monument to Mary Shortgrave in St Peter's Church, Northampton (1732)
- Monument to Thomas Peace at Hardingstone (1732)
- Monument to Elizabeth Trimmell at Brockhall, Northamptonshire (1737)
- Monument to William Watson at Spratton (1738)
- Monument to John Raynford at Faxton (1740)
- Monument to Anthony Eynead at All Saints' Church, Northampton (1741)
- Monument to John Smith at St Peter's Church, Northampton (1742)
- Monument to Samuel Pennington in St Giles' Church, Northampton (1743)
- Monument to Dorcas Stratford at All Saints' Church, Northampton (1744)
- Monument to John Nicolls Raynford (1746) now in Victoria and Albert Museum
