= Thomas Haweis =

English clergyman

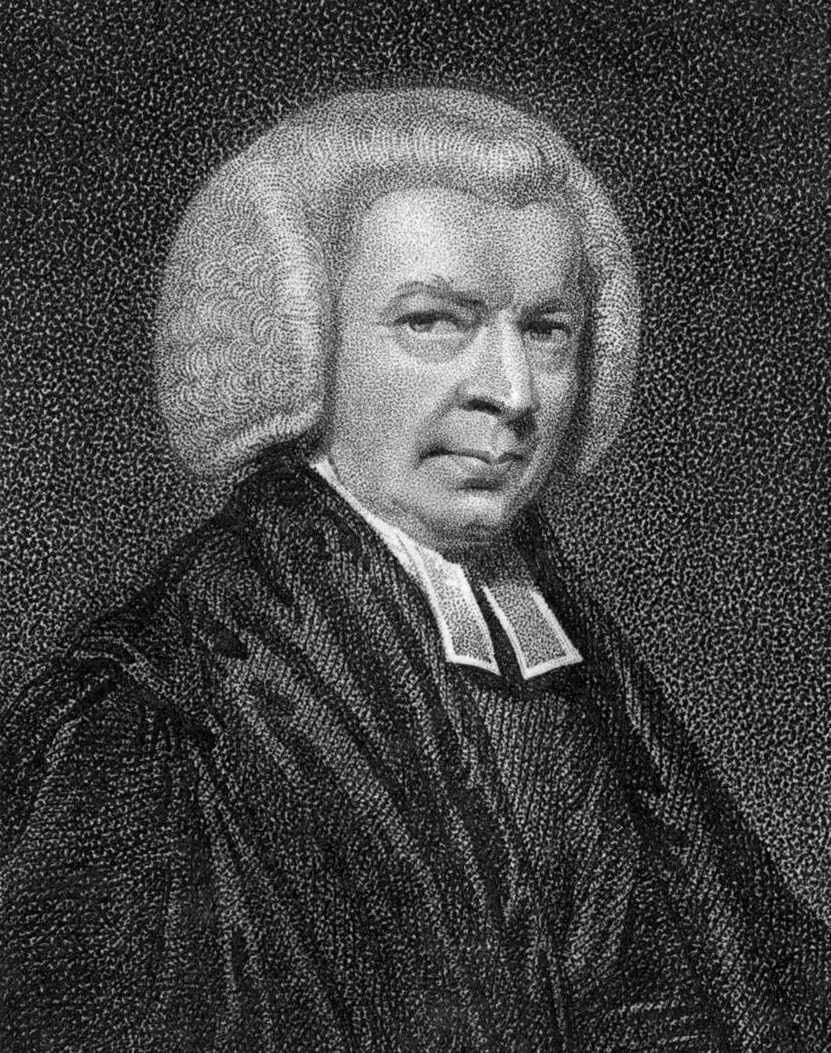
- Church of England cleric and evangelist
- Born: 1 January 1734; Redruth, Cornwall, England
- Died: 11 February 1820 (aged 86); Bath, Somerset, England

Thomas Haweis (surname pronounced to rhyme with "pause"; 1 January 1734 – 11 February 1820) was an English minister. As a Church of England cleric he was one of the leading figures of the 18th century evangelical revival and a key figure in the histories of the Countess of Huntingdon's Connexion and the London Missionary Society.

== Early life and conversion to evangelical Christianity ==
Haweis was born in Redruth, Cornwall, where he was baptised on 20 February 1734. He was the son of a solicitor, who was able to have him educated at Truro Grammar School, but, after his father's death, his mother was too poor to send him to university and so, after an apprenticeship, he practised for some time as an apothecary and physician. Guided by George Conon, the master of Truro Grammar School, Haweis was introduced to the doctrines of the evangelical revival.

Sponsored by the Reverend Joseph Jane of St Mary Magdalene Parish Church in Oxford, in 1748 he entered Christ's College. There he organised a prayer group often seen as a successor to the Wesleys' "Holy Club". After graduation, he was ordained in the Church of England by the Bishop of Oxford in 1757 to serve as curate to Joseph Jane.

In 1762, he was appointed to the Lock Hospital, London, under the guidance of the chaplain, Martin Madan. At this time he met Selina Hastings, Countess of Huntingdon, and preached in many of her chapels. Although offered an incumbency in Philadelphia by George Whitefield, he opted instead to become rector of All Saints’ Church, Aldwincle, Northamptonshire, in 1764, retaining the living until his death in 1820.

== Countess of Huntingdon's connexion ==
In 1774 he was appointed chaplain to the Countess of Huntingdon. He insisted that no one other than a Church of England cleric be allowed to preach in any chapel where he ministered. However, once the chapels forming the Countess of Huntingdon's Connection were forced to register as dissenting chapels, Haweis withdrew from her service.

By her will, the Countess of Huntingdon left management of the Connexion to four trustees. The principal trustee appointed was, most unexpectedly, Thomas Haweis, who continued to preside over the Connexion, comprising at that time about 120 chapels, even though he continued as a Church of England priest. He made every effort to ensure the Connexion kept as close to the Church of England as was possible and that only the Book of Common Prayer was used. Many of these chapels became part of the Free Church of England in 1863.

Haweis was also one of the founding fathers of the Missionary Society.

== Works ==
Haweis published several prose works, including:

- Evangelical Principles and Practice (1762)
- A History of the Church
- A Translation of the New Testament (1795)
- A Commentary on the Holy Bible
- The Communicant's Spiritual Companion

Haweis' 14 sermons in "Evangelical Principles and Practice" formed part of the standard training materials for Connexion ordinands, akin to John Wesley's 44 sermons.

In the early 1790s, Haweis published two books with the same title: Carmina Christo, or Hymns to the Saviour.

- A book of music, probably published in 1791, with seventeen hymn tunes composed by Haweis with words apparently written by Haweis. However one exception was the hymn written by Samuel Johnson, 'City of God, how broad and far' for which Haweis composed the music at Richmond.
- A book of the words to hymns, published in 1792, consisting of 139 hymns, which was enlarged to 256 hymns in a second edition in 1808.

Haweis died in Bath on 11 February 1820 and is buried at Bath Abbey.

== Historiography ==
There is just one biography of Haweis. Summaries of his work are given by Bishop Frank Vaughan and by Bishop John Fenwick in their works on the Free Church of England, used in this article.

== Family ==
Haweis was married three times.

1. In 1771 to Judith Wordsworth née Townsend (died 1786), widow of John Wordsworth. She was the daughter of Chauncy Townsend and sister of the Rev. Joseph Townsend (1739–1816), a Calvinistic Methodist preacher.
2. In 1788 to Janet Payne Orton (died 1799), a companion of Lady Huntingdon.
3. In 1802 to Elizabeth McDowall (died 1855).

He had one son, by the third marriage, the Rev. John Oliver Willyams Haweis.
