= Edward Pierce (priest) =

Welsh Anglican priest and writer (d. 1694)

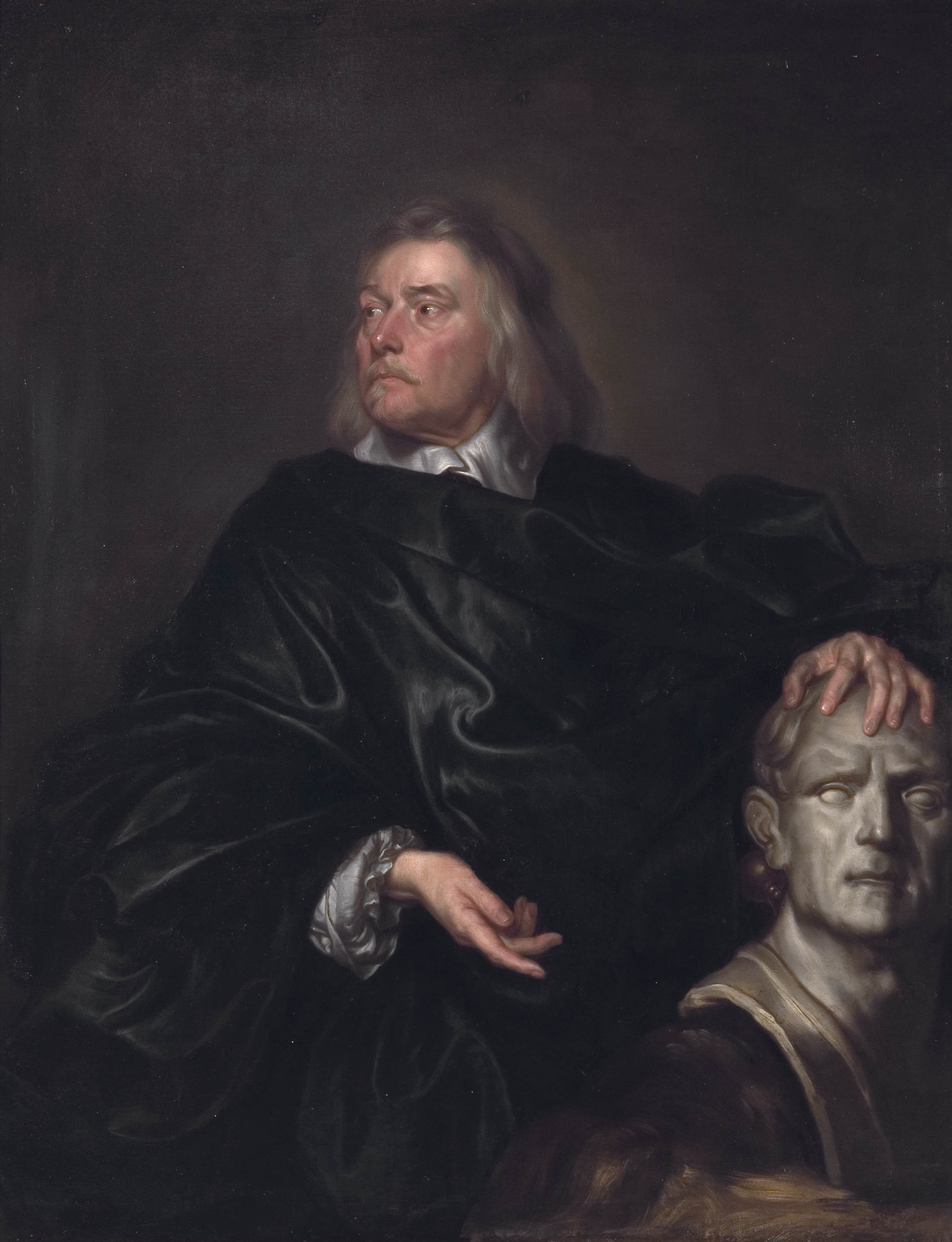

Edward Pierce (or Edward Pearse) (1630 or 1631–1694) was a Welsh Anglican priest and writer.

== Life ==
Pierce was born in Wales in 1630 or 1631 (the location and date is uncertain) and was educated at Jesus College, Oxford, from 1650 to 1657 before his ordination in 1659. He ministered in various parishes in Northamptonshire (at St Sepulchre's, Northampton, 1660 to 1663; Duston, 1662 to 1663; All Saints, Aldwincle and Cottesbrooke, 1663 to 1694) under the patronage of a Northamptonshire landowner, Sir John Langham, who was from Cottesbrooke. Pierce died in the rectory of Cottesbrooke on 2 September 1694 and was buried in the chancel of the church. His eldest son, John, succeeded him as rector of Cottesbrooke.

== Writings ==
In 1675, Pierce described the Great Fire of Northampton and continued to write thereafter, with anonymous works in the 1680s criticising persecution of dissenters such as The Conformists Plea for the Nonconformists (1681), which went through three editions. His viewpoint attracted criticism and some church leaders saw him as dangerous. In his ministry, he endeavoured to keep dissenters within the Church of England through his tolerance and his refusal to insist on following all the requirements of the rites of the Church. His last work, published in 1691, was a sermon preached to the prisoners sentenced to death at the Assizes in September 1690, entitled Christ Alone our Life.
