= All Saints' Church, Northampton =

Church in Northamptonshire, England

Coordinates: 52°14′13″N 0°53′48″W

All Saints' Church
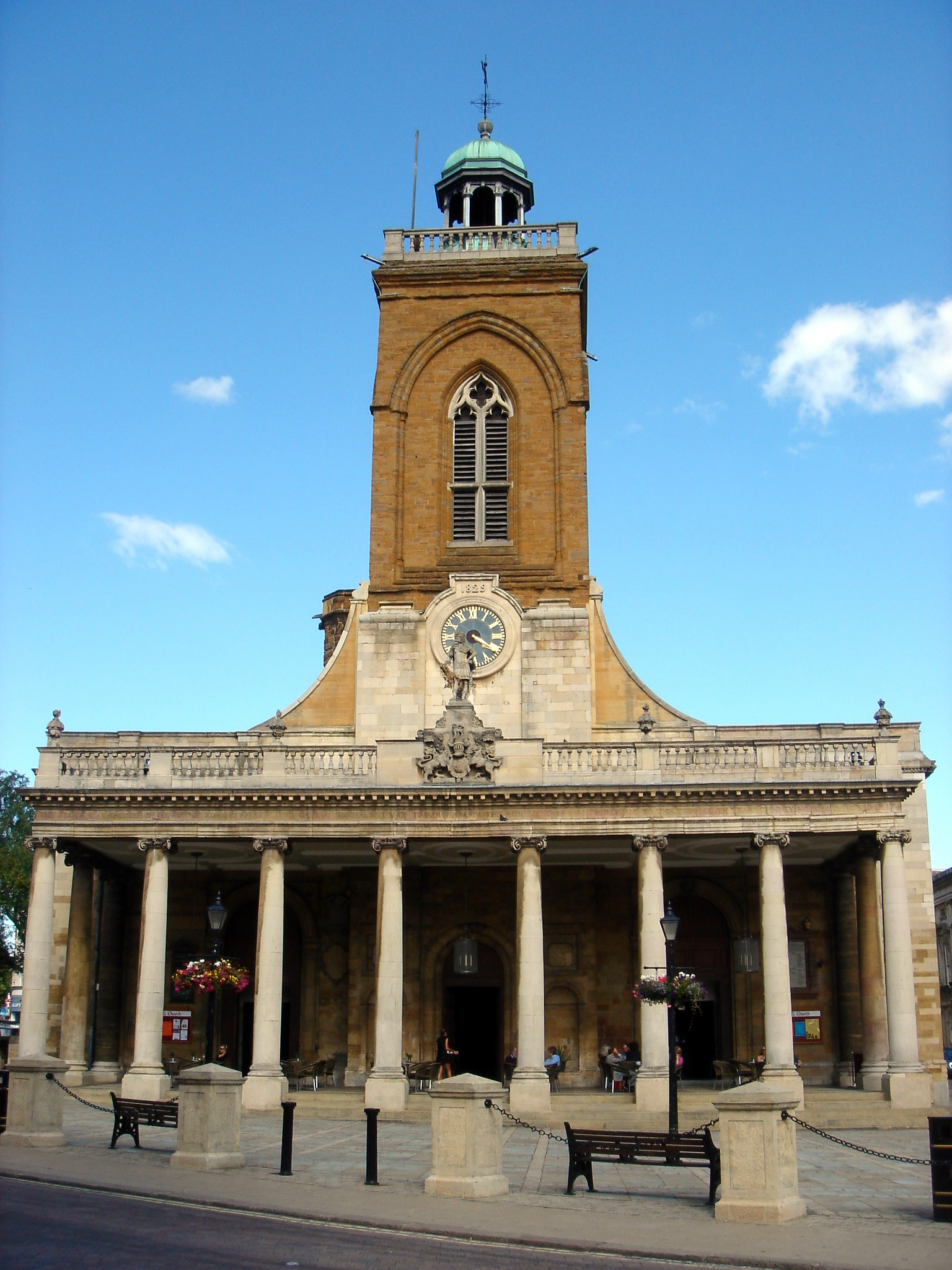
- All Saints' Church, Northampton
- All Saints' Church
- Country: England
- Denomination: Church of England
- Churchmanship: Anglo-Catholic
- Website: www.allsaintsnorthampton.co.uk

History
- Dedication: All Saints

Administration
- Province: Canterbury
- Diocese: Peterborough

Clergy
- Bishop: The Rt Revd Luke Irvine-Capel (AEO)
- Rector: Canon Oliver Coss SSC

All Saints' Church, Northampton is a Church of England parish church in the centre of Northampton. The current church was largely built after a fire and was consecrated in 1680. It is a Grade I listed building.

== History ==
Simon de Senlis' church of All Hallows, Northampton, England, lasted with medieval alterations until 20 September 1675 when much of the old town was destroyed by the Great Fire of Northampton. The fire began in St Mary's Street, near the castle, and the inhabitants fled to the Market Square, but then were forced to evacuate, leaving the buildings to burn, including All Hallows:

"All Hallows Bells jangled their last and doleful Knell, presently after the Chimes had gone Twelve in a more pleasant Tune: And soon after the wind which did flie swifter than Horsemen, carried the Fire near the Dern-Gate, at least half a Mile from the place where it began, and into St Giles-street in the East, and consumed every house therein, save one, whose end-Walls were higher than the Roof, and by them preserved."

=== The new church ===
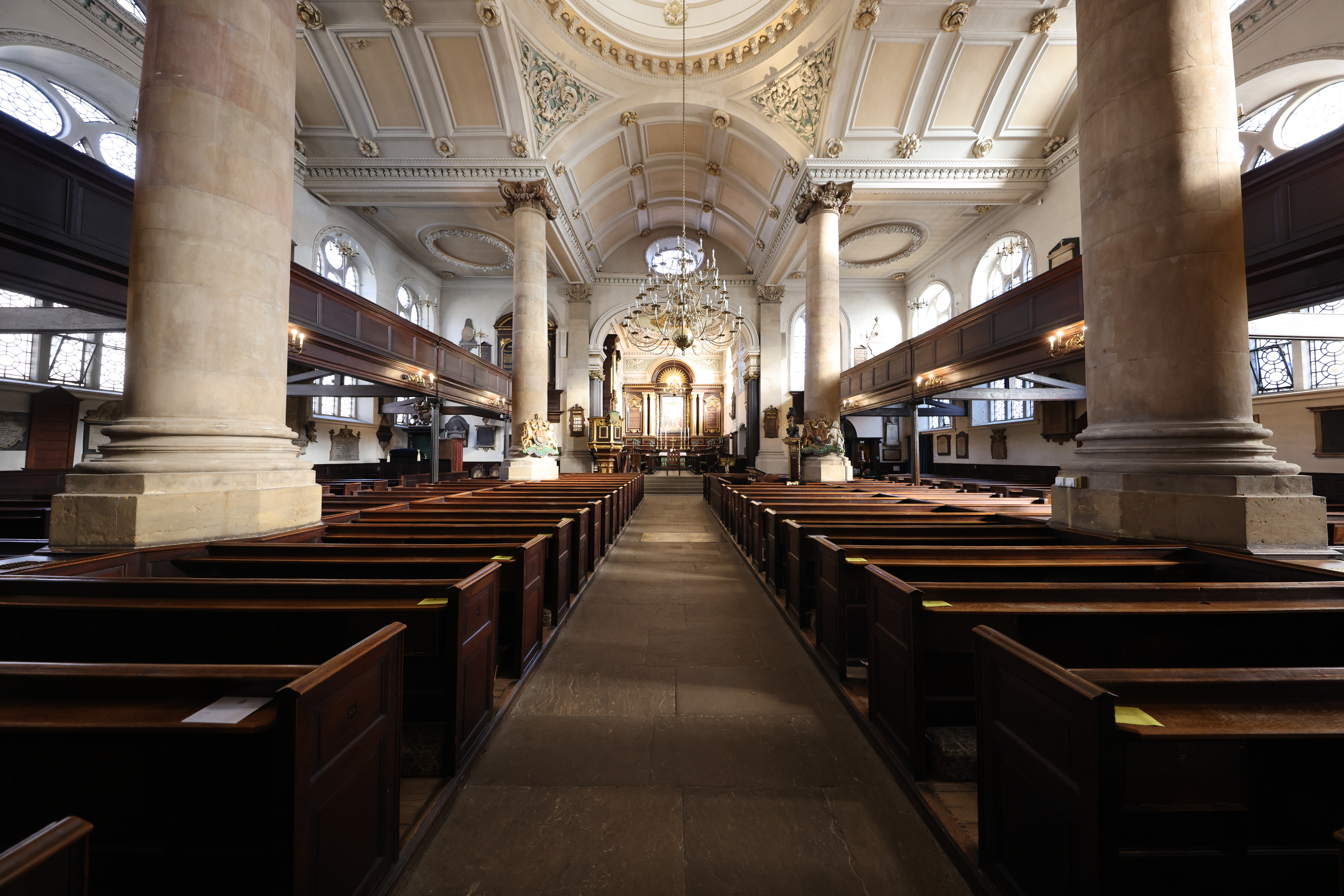
All Saints' interior

After the fire, Charles II gave a thousand tons of timber for the rebuilding of All Hallows' Church, and one tenth of the money collected for the rebuilding of the town was allocated to the rebuilding of All Hallows', under the management of the King's Lynn architect, Henry Bell and Edward Edwards. Bell was resident in Northampton at the time, and he set to rebuild the church in a manner similar to Sir Christopher Wren's designs.

The central medieval tower survived the fire, as did the crypt. The new church of All Saints' was built east of the tower in an almost square plan, with a chancel to the east and a north and south narthex flanking the tower.

Visitors enter the church through the existing tower into a barrel vaulted nave. At the centre is a dome, supported on four Ionic columns, which is lit by a lantern above. The barrel vault extends into the aisles from the dome in a Greek-cross form, leaving four flat ceilings in the corners of the church. The church is well lit by plain glass windows in the aisles and originally there was a large east window in the chancel, that is now covered by a reredos. The plasterwork ceiling is finely decorated, and the barrel vaults are lit by elliptical windows.

=== Present day ===
All Saints' sits in the Catholic tradition of the Church of England. The parochial church council passed Resolutions A, B and C in 1993, after the Church of England voted to allow the ordination of women to the priesthood. As the parish rejects the ordination of women, it received alternative episcopal oversight from the Bishop of Richborough (currently Luke Irvine-Capel).

All Saints' is open from 9:00am to 5:00pm throughout the year, with extended opening on days with choral services.

== Architecture ==
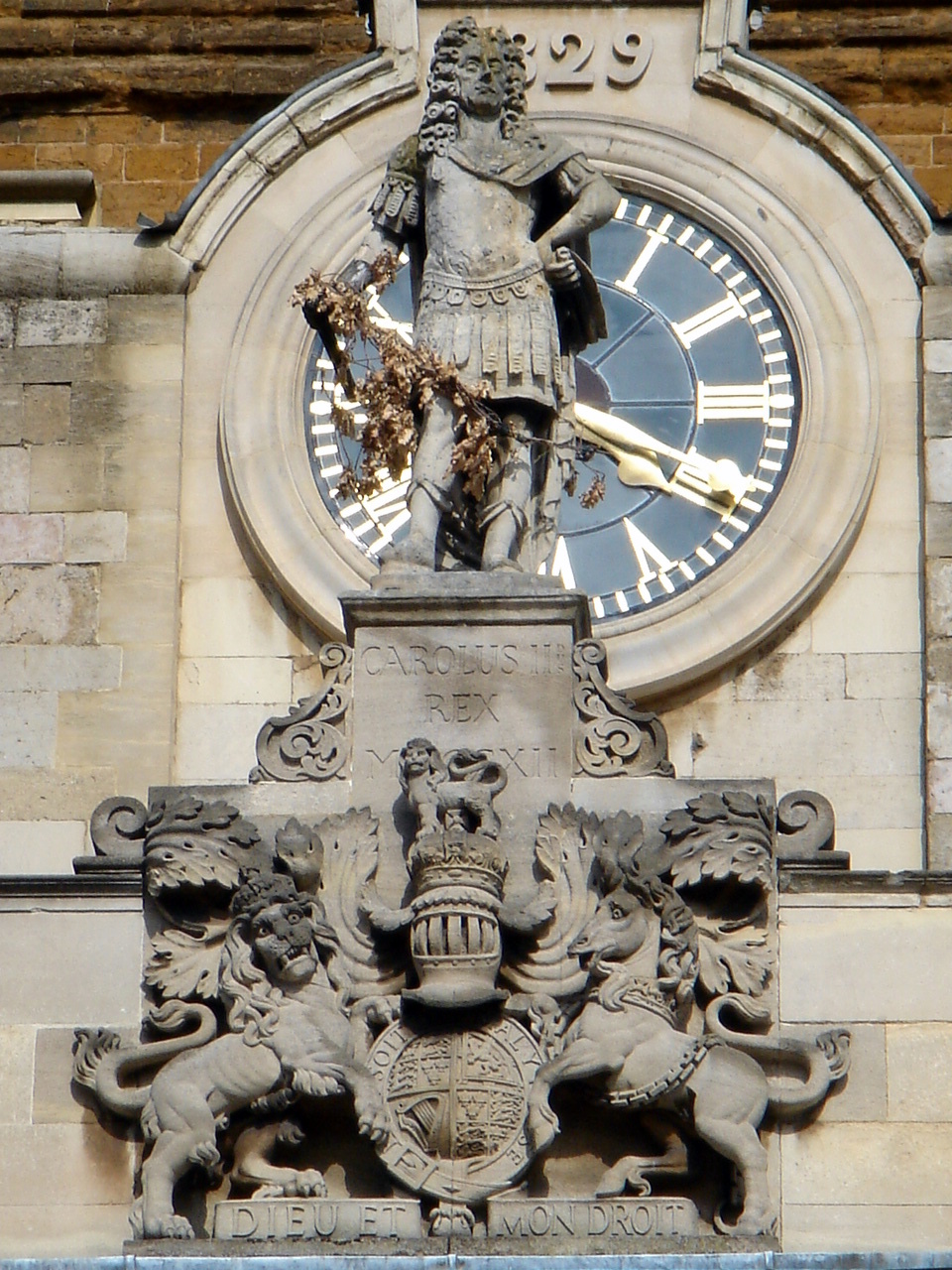
A statue of King Charles II by John Hunt was erected on the portico parapet of the rebuilt church in 1712

Built in the style of Christopher Wren's London churches rebuilt after the Great Fire of London, it has in the past been mistakenly attributed to him. The rebuilding of the city churches was initiated by financing of the Rebuilding of London Act 1670. Wren, as Surveyor General of the King's Works, undertook the operation, and one of his first London churches was St Mary-at-Hill.

The interior space of St Mary-at-Hill is roughly square in plan, and of a similar size to All Saints'. To the west is the tower, again flanked by a north and south narthex. Wren spanned the square space by a barrel vault in a Greek-cross plan, with a dome at the centre, supported on four columns. If Henry Bell drew his inspiration from any one of Wren's churches, this would be the one. The barrel-vaulting though in All Saints' is much flatter than in St Mary-at-Hill, which has semi-circular vaulting. The dome in All Saints' is more hemi-spherical, and the columns at St Mary-at-Hill are Corinthian with fluting. The Mayoral Seat dominates the pews on the south side, and in the north aisle there is a Consistory Court. Icons of Saint Peter and Saint Katharine are situated at the east end before the steps in to the Quire. These were painted for the church in 2001 to reflect the parish boundaries, which include the site of St Katharine's Church (demolished) and St Peter's Church.

The rebuilt church of All Saints' was consecrated and opened in 1680. In 1701, a large portico was added to the west end, in front of the narthex, very much in the style of the Inigo Jones portico added to Old St Paul's Cathedral in the 1630s. The All Saints' portico was added as a memorial to Charles II's contribution to the rebuilding of the church after the fire, and a statue of him was erected above the portico, dressed in a Roman tunic. At 12:00pm on Oak Apple Day each year, the choir sings a Latin hymn to Charles II from the roof as the statue is wreathed in oak leaves by the Mayor of Northampton; a similar ceremony takes place on Ascension Day at 7:00am.

The church building underwent some restoration in the 1970s under the direction of the Vicar at the time, Rev. Victor Mallan.

In 2006, the present Chancel Organ was installed (replacing the previous instrument from 1981 which had come to the end of its useful life) to accompany the choirs. Alongside this, a new ring of 10 bells in the key of E, replacing a heavier ring of 8 bells which dated from 1782, and which, by all accounts, weren't very easy to ring. In 2008, the Narthex, Sacristy and lavatories were refurbished. A privately leased coffee shop (All Saints' Bistro) operates from its north and south areas, and on the space under the portico. The north end of the coffee shop is named the John Clare Lounge, after the poet who sat outside this space, composing his poems.

== Music ==
=== Choir ===
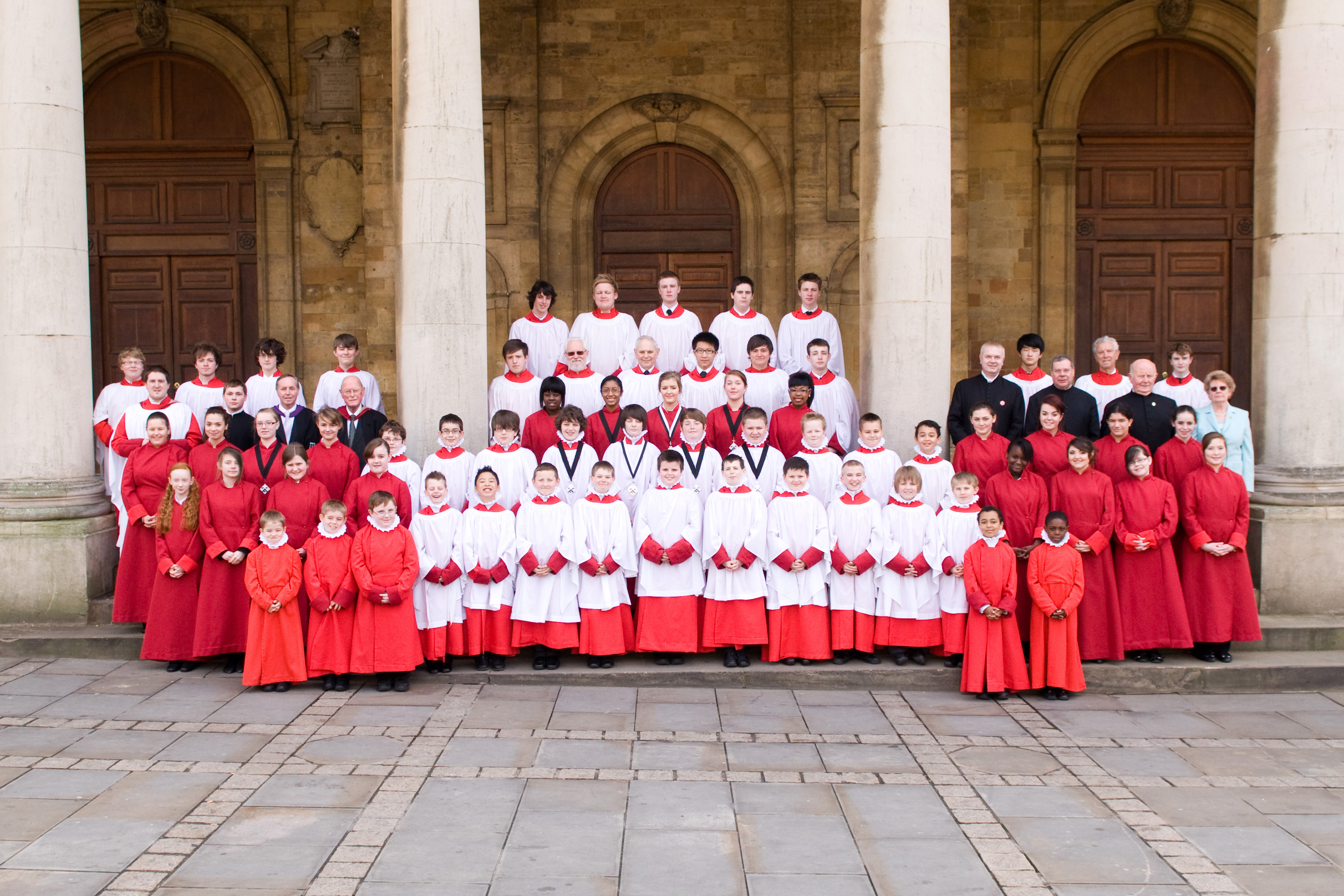
The choirs of All Saints' Church

The choir of All Saints' Church was formed in the 1100s for the old church of All Hallows', lost in 1675. There are currently three groups which make up the choirs: the Boys Choir, the Girls Choir and the Choral Scholars and Lay Clerks. The boys choir ranges in age from 7 to 15, and the girls from 8 to 18. The lower parts consist of Choral Scholars with an age range of 15 to 18, some having previously sung in the treble line, and Lay Clerks.

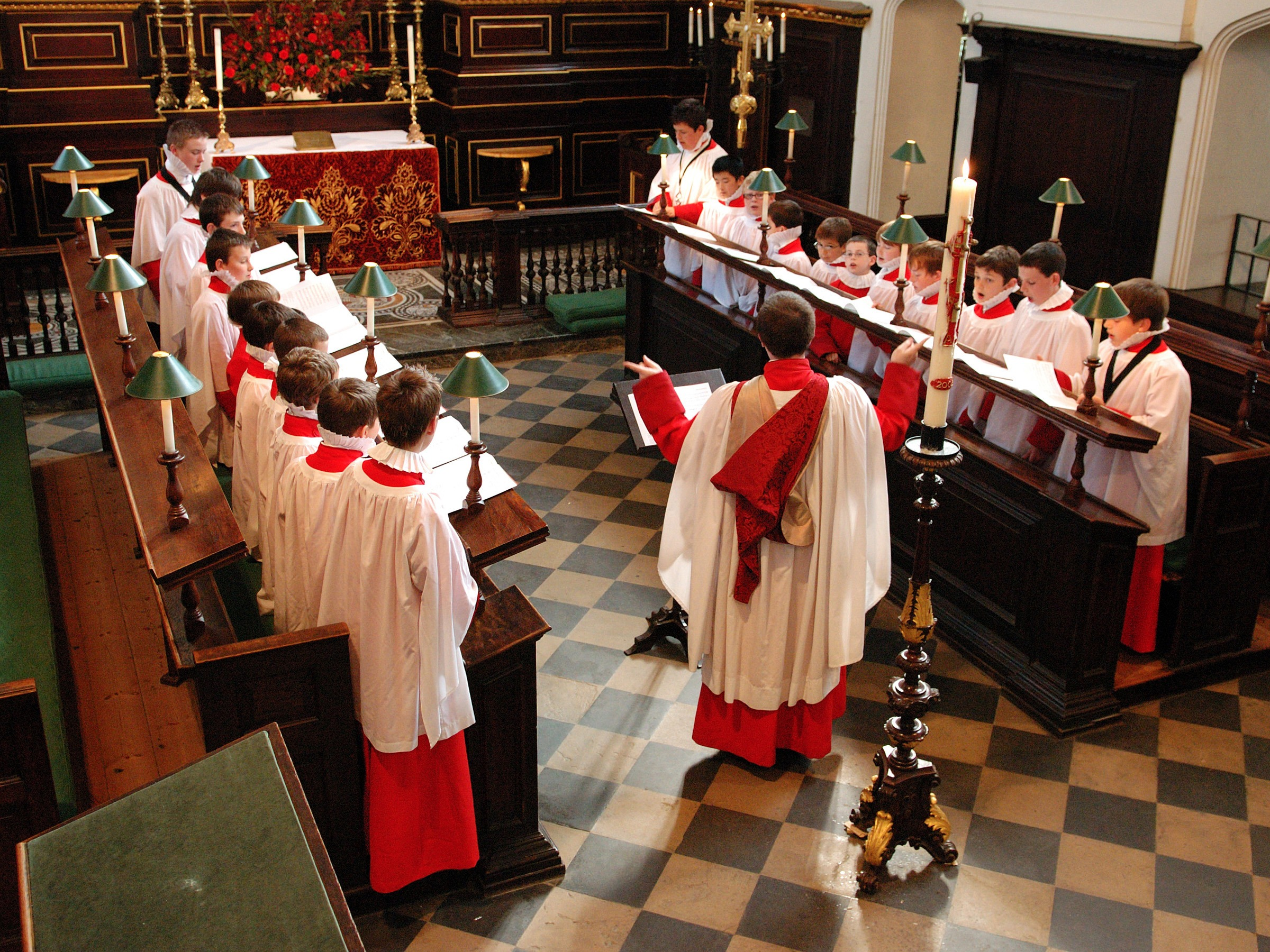
The Boys Choir in the quire

These choirs sing at 5 choral services a week, including Sunday Mass and Evensong throughout the week.

=== Instruments ===
The church has 6 instruments: 3 pipe organs, and 3 pianos:

==== West organ ====
Built by J. W. Walker & Sons Ltd in 1982/3, using 6 ranks of pipes from the previous organ by William Hill & Sons 1872/1884/Brindley & Foster 1912/1926, and the front part of the main case is from an instrument by Thomas Swarbrick, 1709. The instrument is the church's largest, with 40 stops spread over 3 manuals and pedals.

==== Chancel organ ====
Built by Alfred Monk, rebuilt by Hill, Norman & Beard in 1939 originally for St Andrew's 'Scotch' Church Bournemouth, it was removed in 2004 and moved to All Saints' with new ranks by Kenneth Tickell, who installed it in 2006. It has 33 stops spread over 3 manuals and pedals.

==== Memorial Chapel organ ====
Built by J. W. Walker & Sons Ltd in 1983, and consists of 2 ranks (Gedackt and Diapason), which can be combined in various ways using 10 stops.

== Ministers ==
- 1974-86: Victor Malan
- 1987-88: James Heslop
- 1989-2009: Simon Godfrey
- 2012-16: David McConkey
- 2016-: Oliver Coss (united benefice with Holy Sepulchre from 2025)

== See also ==
- List of churches in Northampton
- 17th-century Western domes
