= Franklyn Lushington =

Archdeacon of Malta

Franklyn de Winton Lushington (29 March 1868 – 30 March 1941) was Archdeacon of Malta from 1901 until 1903.

Lushington was born in Madras, educated at Clare College, Cambridge and ordained in 1894. In 1899 he married Monica Sydney Sanderson in Elstree where he was an assistant master at the preparatory school. In 1911 he became Headmaster of Dover College, leaving to become a Chaplain to the Forces during World War I. After the war he was the Incumbent at Danehill then King's Langley.
