= Simon Godfrey (priest) =

British Anglican priest

The Very Reverend Canon Simon Godfrey SSC
- Former Chancellor of St Paul's Pro-Cathedral
- Church: Church of England
- Diocese: Diocese in Europe
- Appointed: 18 January 2009
- In office: 2009–2022
- Predecessor: Tom Mendel

Orders
- Ordination: June 1982

Personal details
- Born: London, England, United Kingdom
- Residence: Private apartment in Gozo, Malta

Simon Godfrey was an Anglican priest who became a member of the Roman Catholic Church in September 2024. Canon Godfrey served as the Chancellor of St Paul's Pro-Cathedral in Valletta, Malta between 2009 and 2022.

== Biography ==
Simon Godfrey was born in London and educated in Devon at Homelands School and Britannia Royal Naval College. He studied Theology at King's College London. During this time he served on the Parochial Church Council of St Magnus-the-Martyr church in London. He also was Head Server at Westminster Abbey. He served his Curacy at the church of St Peter and Paul in Kettering, Northamptonshire before taking his first post as Rector of St Margaret's church in Crick, Northamptonshire. In 1989 he became Vicar of All Saints' Church, Northampton and Rector of Northampton in 1998. He remained in this position until January 18, 2009 when he was appointed as Chancellor of St Paul's Pro-Cathedral in Valletta succeeding Canon Tom Mendel. One of his major achievements since becoming chancellor was the restoration of the historic organ of St Paul's dating from 1694.

Church of England titles
Preceded by Tom Mendel	Chancellor of St Paul's; 2009–2022	Succeeded by Sede vacante
