= The Holy Sepulchre, Northampton =

Church in Northampton, England

Coordinates: 52.2415°N 0.8975°W

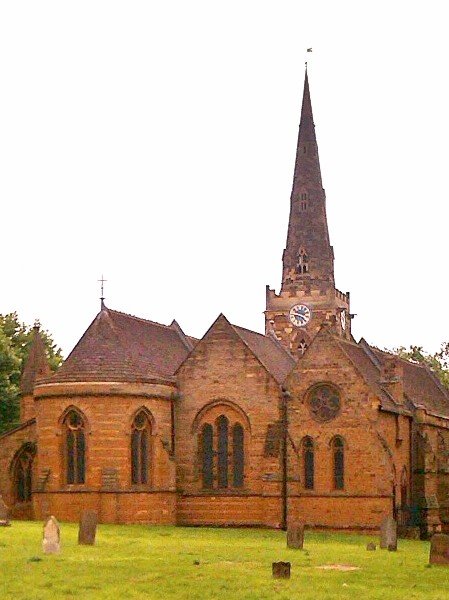
The Holy Sepulchre, Northampton

The Holy Sepulchre is a Norman round church in Sheep Street, Northampton, England. It is a Grade I listed building. Dating from circa 1100, it was possibly built by Simon de Senlis, Earl of Northampton.

There are four medieval round churches still in use in England; the others are: Holy Sepulchre, Cambridge; Temple Church, London; and St John the Baptist, Little Maplestead, Essex.

The Church of the Holy Sepulchre (Northampton) Restoration Trust was established in 1982 as a registered charity.

== Inspiration ==
Simon de Senlis, Earl of Northampton, was responsible for making Northampton a Norman stronghold by building Northampton Castle (now destroyed) and a town wall (approximately on the site of the present inner ring road). It is also probable that he was responsible for the building of All Hallows Church by the market place in the centre of Northampton and the church of the Holy Sepulchre to the north.

In around 1096, Simon de Senlis joined the First Crusade to the Holy Land. There he would have seen the Church of the Holy Sepulchre near the centre of Jerusalem. He would have seen it as a round church supported on eighteen columns or piers with an ambulatory around the perimeter on the west of the church, and the well attested site of Christ's tomb at the centre. There would have been four apses at each of the cardinal points, and on the east side there would have been a facade, so that the east apse was accessible directly from the rotunda. After restoration, this church is what would have remained of a 4th-century church built by Constantine I.

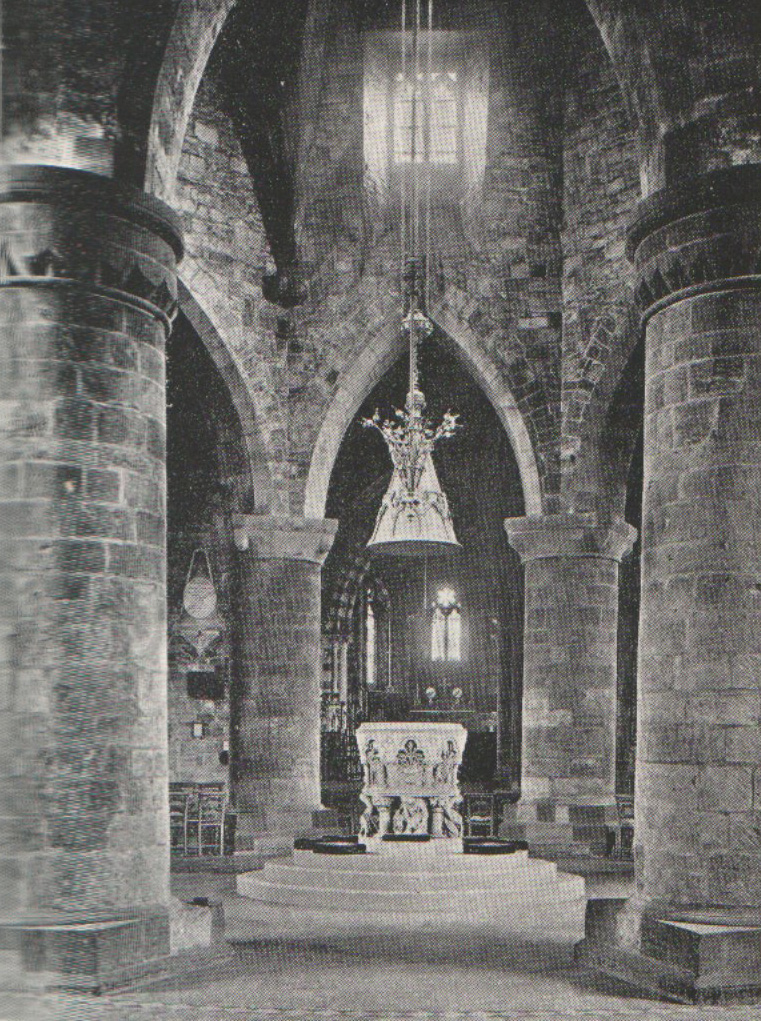
Holy Sepulchre interior from Rev. Cox and Rev. Serjeantson History of the Church of the Holy Sepulchre Northampton (1897)

It is likely that after his return to Northampton, Simon de Senlis built the "Holy Sepulchre" in Northampton, ca 1100. It is approximately half the size of the church in Jerusalem. The original church of about 1100 had a round nave of 8 columns, supporting a triforium. An ambulatory ran round the perimeter. The remains of a Norman window in the present nave, however, suggests that the original round church had a chancel to the east, probably apse-ended.

Holy Sepulchre, Cambridge (aisles removed)

A North aisle was added circa 1180 and second North aisle was added circa 1275. During the early 15th century, a South aisle was built, the triforium of the round nave was replaced by a clerestory, and a Western tower was added.

== Original building ==
Crusades and pilgrimages continued to the Holy Land, resulting in further building of round churches in England, and around thirty years after the building of the Holy Sepulchre, Northampton, a similar Holy Sepulchre church was built in Cambridge which, although smaller than the one in Northampton, may be indicative of the original church.

The entrance of the Round Church in Cambridge is through a west round-arched doorway. The entrance to the Northampton church may have been similar, as the south porch is of a much later date and, in the 14th century, a tower and spire was added to the west of the round church. On entering the church at Cambridge, the plan is similar with eight large round piers, but unlike the church in Northampton, the ambulatory is vaulted with a gallery above. The piers support Norman round arches and there is Norman dog-tooth or zig-zag decoration throughout.

At the Holy Sepulchre, Northampton, three original Norman windows survive: one to the left of the south porch at low level and two on the north at high level. The fact that windows are positioned at two different levels indicates there would have been a gallery. Evidence of a corbel running round the perimeter supports the argument, but unlike Cambridge, there are no springers to suggest the form of vaulting. There are no gallery openings in the rotunda at high level and the piers support pointed arches characteristic of a more later architecture than the Norman round arches.

The church at Cambridge has a conical stone-slated roof. In the nineteenth century it was restored as was expected to be in keeping with the original Norman design. The Holy Sepulchre, Northampton, presently has a slightly flatter lead roof and it is likely that the roof was originally as the roof at Cambridge.

== Alterations ==
Throughout the ages, a nave, chancel and aisles were added to the east of the round church at Northampton, and in the nineteenth century, the prolific architect Sir George Gilbert Scott was involved in extensive restoration to bring the church into its present state. The chancel screen is by John Oldrid Scott, 1880.

== Clergy ==
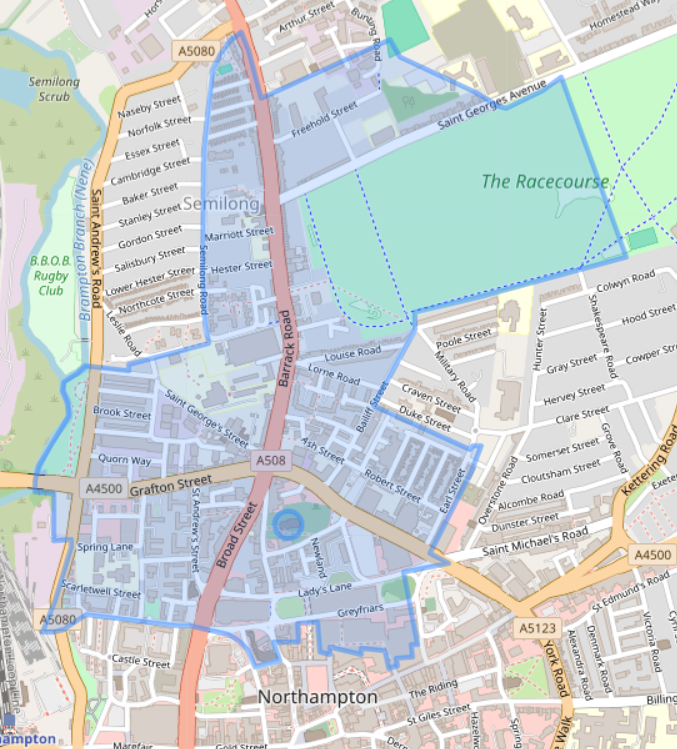
- Ancient parish boundaries of Northampton St Sepulchre's parish (the blue circle marks the location of the church)
  John de Bothby
- Robert Sibthorpe from 1619
- Edward Pierce, 1660 to 1663
- Peter Whalley, 1748 to 1762
- Howard Tibbs (1966-1985)
- Keith Anderson (1987-1998)
- Neil Mannahouse (1999-2002)
- Michael Hills (2004-2022)
- Oliver Coss (2025-, united benefice with All Saints)

== Burials ==
- Lochlann, Lord of Galloway

== See also ==
- Grade I listed buildings in Northamptonshire
- List of churches in Northampton
