= Churches Conservation Trust =

Charity for historic English churches

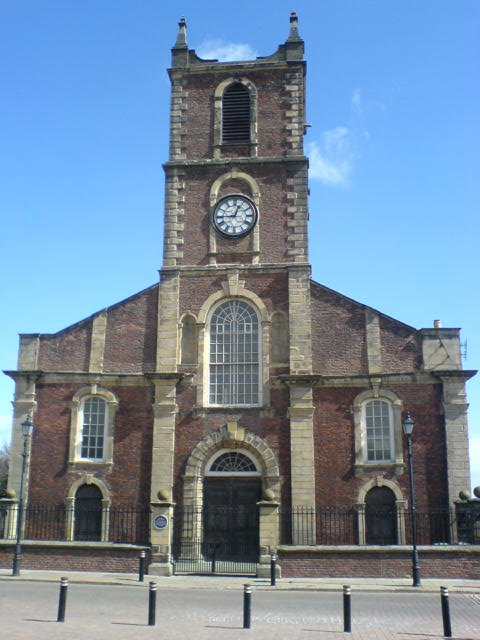
Holy Trinity, Sunderland, a Grade I listed church under the care and ownership of the Trust

The Churches Conservation Trust is a registered charity whose purpose is to protect historic churches at risk in England. The charity cares for over 350 churches of architectural, cultural and historic significance, which have been transferred into its care by the Church of England.

The Trust works to prevent any deterioration in the condition of the buildings in its care, and to ensure they are in use as community assets. Local communities are encouraged to use them for activities and events, and the buildings provide an educational resource, allowing children and young people to study history, architecture and other subjects.

Most of the churches saved from closure are Grade I or Grade II* listed. Many are open to visitors as heritage sites, and nearly 2 million people visit the Trust's churches each year. The majority of the churches remain consecrated, though they are not used for regular worship.

== History ==
The trust was established by a Church of England Pastoral Measure of 1969 under its original name, the Redundant Churches Fund, for "the preservation, in the interests of the nation and the Church of England, of churches and parts of churches of historic and archaeological interest or architectural quality vested in the Fund ... together with their contents so vested".

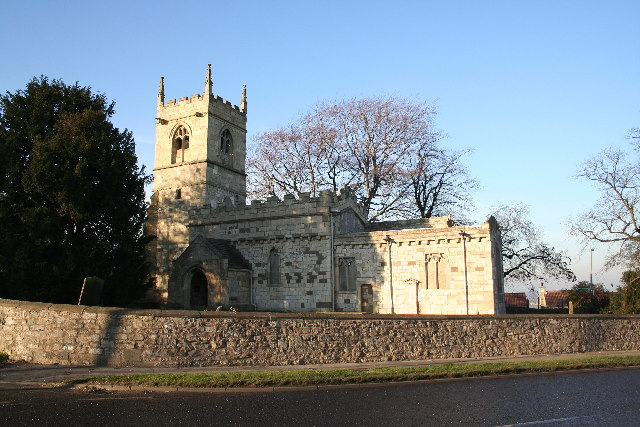
St Peter's Parish Church in Edlington, South Yorkshire

The new charity's first project was the Grade I listed medieval St Peter's parish church at Edlington in South Yorkshire, in 1971. It was virtually in ruins and was extensively restored. By 1979, the trust was caring for 147 churches, increasing to over 250 by 2000, and more than 350 by 2020.

== Relationship to Friends of Friendless Churches ==
An earlier charity, the Friends of Friendless Churches (FoFC), was founded in 1957 by Ivor Bulmer-Thomas, and the high profile of FoFC campaigning contributed to the establishment of the Redundant Churches Fund. Many churches cared for by the FoFC were transferred to the new body. However, the decision to vest a church in the new body lay solely with the Church Commissioners, as co-funder of the Churches Conservation Trust. So, to prevent the demolition of other buildings, the FoFC changed its constitution to enable it to take ownership of churches and chapels more widely, including those in Wales, where CCC is not permitted to operate. The FoFC continues its work, as a separate charity, across England and Wales without finance from either central government or the Church Commissioners, instead relying on gifts and legacies.

== Structure ==
Six charity trustees lead governance, and they delegate day-to-day management to a chief executive and three directors. Since 2022, the chief executive has been Greg Pickup.

== Finances ==
The trust is financed partly by the Department for Culture, Media and Sport and the Church Commissioners, but grants from those bodies were frozen in 2001, since when additional funding has come from other sources, including sponsors and the general public. During the 2016-2017 period, the trust's income was £9,184,283 and expenditures totalled £9,189,061. The income was down 18% down from the previous period because of the "reduced value of legacies and HLF Grants".

During 2016–2017, 92% of the expenditures went to front-line projects, with 65% of that spent on church repairs and maintenance. Most of the balance was spent on efforts to keep churches open by increased tourism, volunteering and partnership programmes. During that year it had 64 employees, and received the support of up to 2,000 volunteers.

== Lists of churches maintained ==
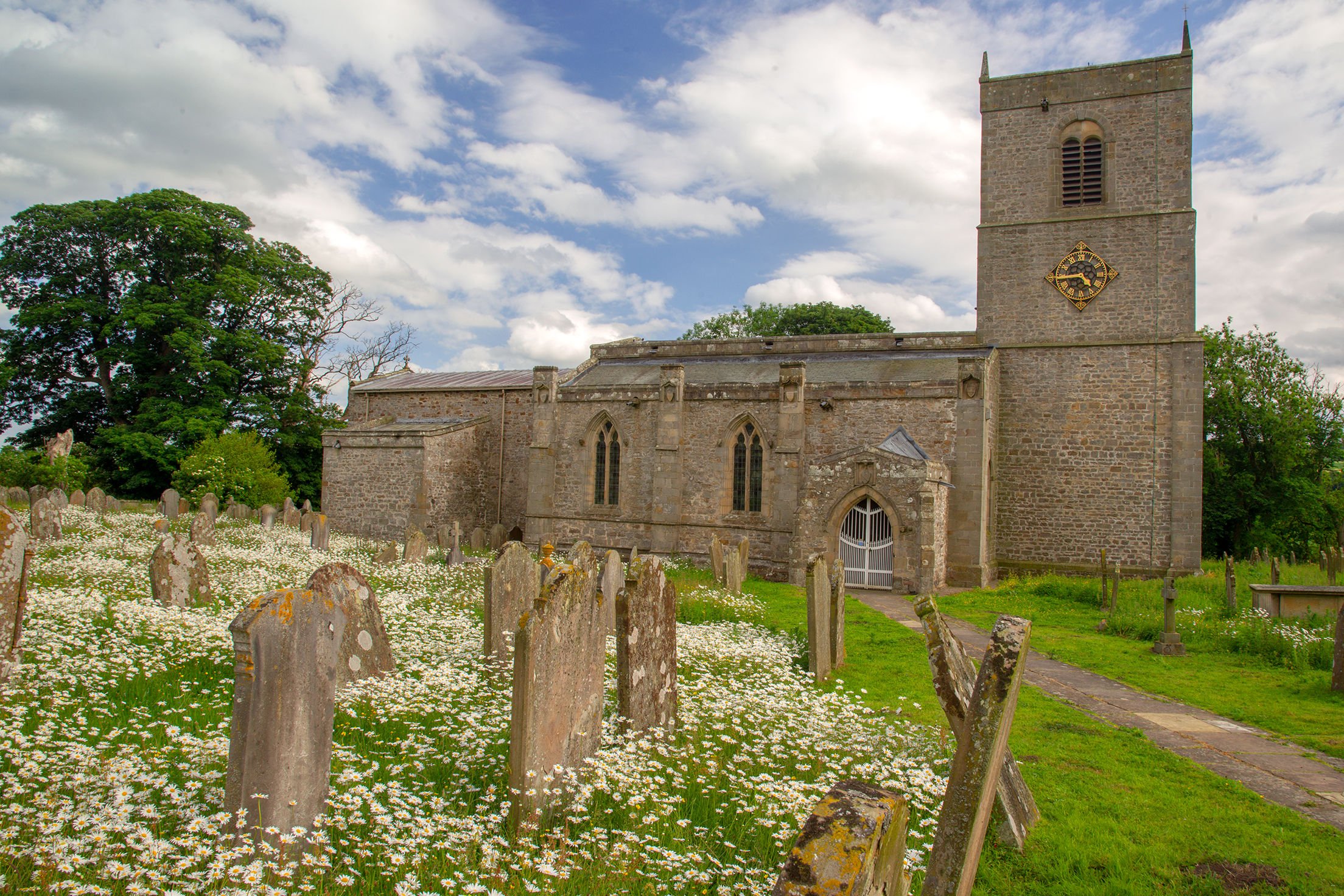
Vested in the Trust, the redundant Holy Trinity Church, Wensley, in North Yorkshire is listed as Grade I. Much of the current structure was built in the 14th and 15th centuries.

Regional lists of churches preserved by the Churches Conservation Trust
Region	Link to regional list	Counties included
Northern England	List	Cheshire, Cumbria, Greater Manchester, Lancashire, Merseyside, Northumberland, Tyne and Wear and Yorkshire
East of England	List	Bedfordshire, Cambridgeshire, Essex, Hertfordshire, Lincolnshire, Norfolk, and Suffolk
English Midlands	List	Derbyshire, Gloucestershire, Herefordshire, Leicestershire, Northamptonshire, Nottinghamshire, Rutland, Shropshire, Staffordshire, Warwickshire and Worcestershire
South East England	List	Berkshire, Buckinghamshire, East Sussex, Greater London, Hampshire, Kent, Oxfordshire, Surrey and West Sussex
South West England	List	Bristol, Cornwall, Devon, Dorset, Somerset and Wiltshire

== Camping ==
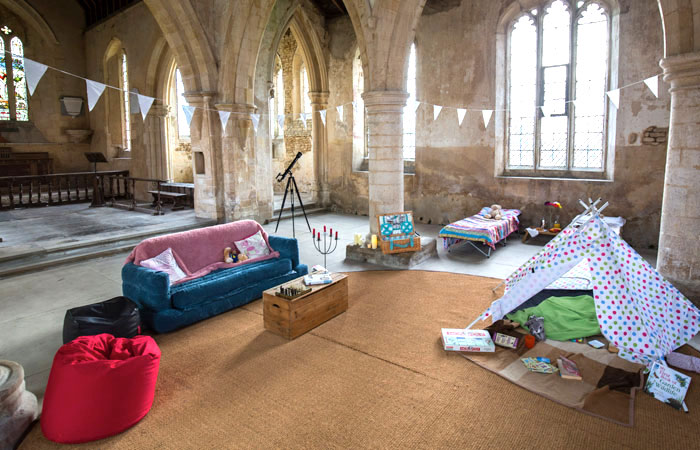
All Saints Church, Aldwincle, Northants, set up for camping

Since 2015, the Churches Conservation Trust has organised camping in some of their churches (called "champing"), providing no-frills, unheated overnight accommodation as a form of fundraising.

== See also ==
- National Churches Trust, a charity protecting historic church buildings across the UK
