= Diocese of Peterborough =

Diocese of Peterborough may refer to:

- Anglican Diocese of Peterborough, in England
- Roman Catholic Diocese of Peterborough, in Ontario, Canada

== See also ==
- Roman Catholic Diocese of East Anglia, covering Peterborough, England
