= St Paul's Pro-Cathedral, Valletta =

St Paul's Pro-Cathedral
- The Pro-Cathedral and Collegiate Parish church of Saint Paul
- Il-Pro-Katidral ta' San Pawl
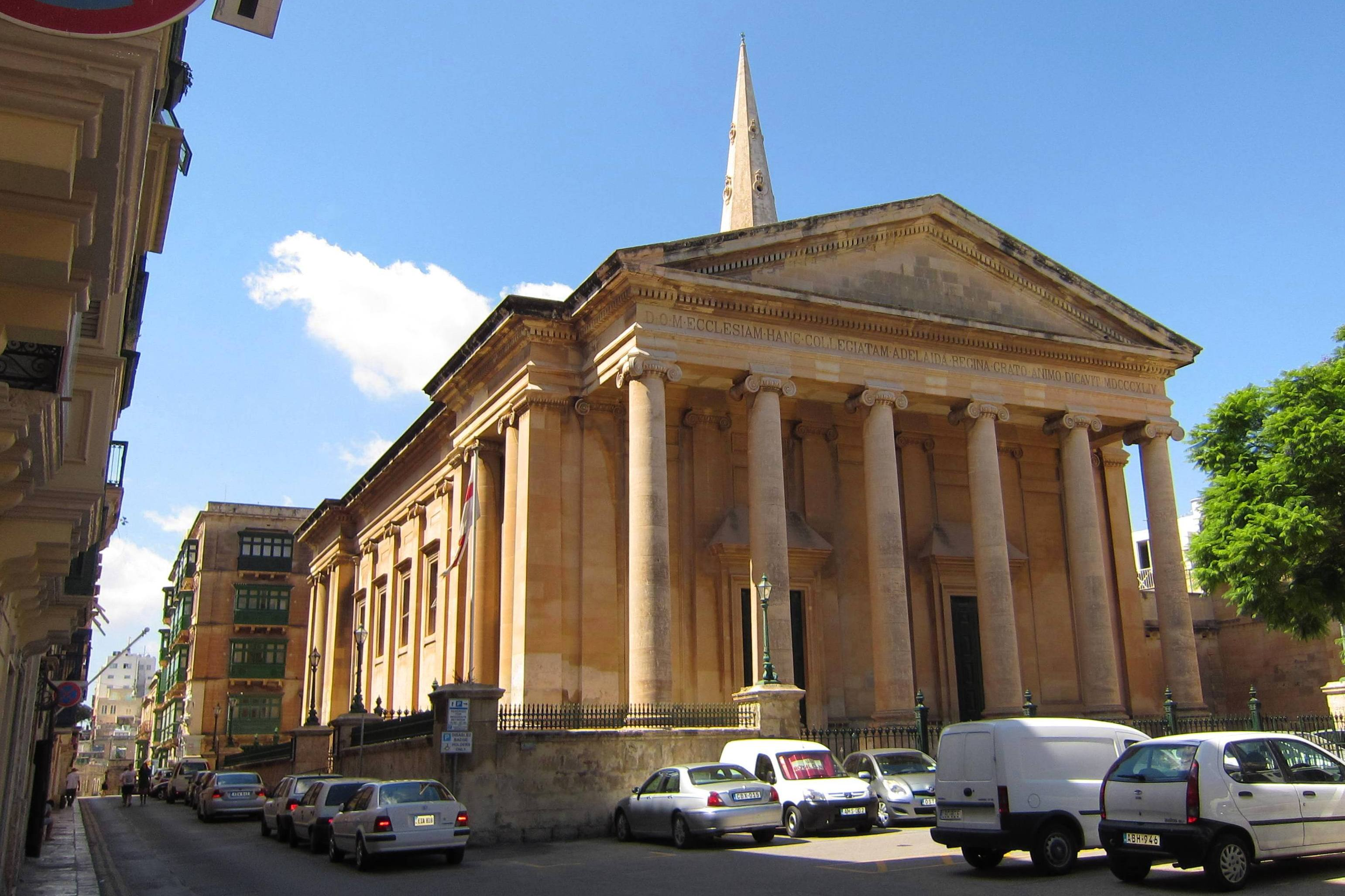
- St Paul's Pro-Cathedral, Valletta
- St Paul's Pro-Cathedral
- 35°54′1.2″N 14°30′41.5″E
- Location: Valletta
- Country: Malta
- Denomination: Church of England
- Churchmanship: High Church
- Website: Cathedral Website

History
- Status: Pro-cathedral
- Founded: 20 March 1839
- Founder: Queen Adelaide
- Dedication: St Paul
- Dedicated: 1 November 1844

Architecture
- Functional status: Active
- Architect: Richard Lankesheer (later adjustments by William Scamp)
- Style: Neo-classical
- Groundbreaking: 1839
- Completed: 1844

Administration
- Province: Canterbury
- Diocese: Diocese in Europe
- Archdeaconry: Italy and Malta

Clergy
- Bishop: Robert Innes

St Paul's Pro-Cathedral (Malti: Il-Pro-Katridral ta' San Pawl), officially The Pro-Cathedral and Collegiate Church of Saint Paul, is an Anglican pro-cathedral of the Diocese in Europe situated in Independence Square, Valletta, Malta. A "pro-cathedral" is a church with cathedral status though not being the main cathedral. It is one of three cathedrals of the Anglican Diocese of Gibraltar in Europe.

== Origin and construction ==
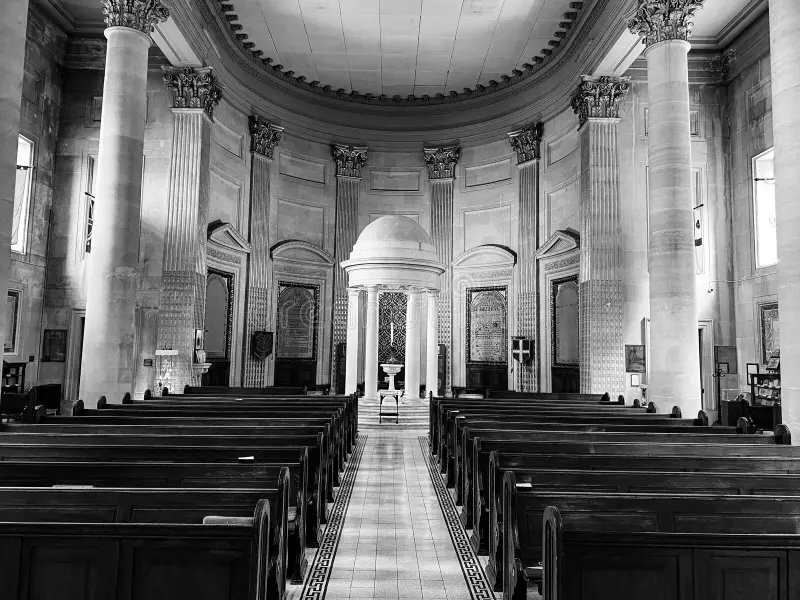
Interior of the cathedral

The cathedral was commissioned by the Dowager Queen Adelaide during a visit to Malta in the 19th century when she found out that there was no place of Anglican worship on the island. Prior to this Anglican services were held in a room in the Grand Master's Palace. Built on the site of the Auberge d'Allemagne (the conventual home of the German Knights Hospitaller), the cathedral was designed by William Scamp and was built between 1839 and 1844. Queen Adelaide laid the foundation stone on 20 March 1839 and her banner hangs above the choir stalls. The original plans were designed by Richard Lankasheer; however, the building proved unstable, thus work had to resume on plans by Scamp in 1841. Scamp's designs located the altar on the west side of the church, but the Bishop of Gibraltar had a more conservative view, thus the designs were altered and Scamp designed an apse inside the great doors to hold the sanctuary on the east side.

== War period and repairs ==
During World War II the cathedral received minor damage and the roof collapsed, but most of the structure remained intact. During restoration works the original designs by Scamp started to take shape. A quire and rood screen were built on the west side of the cathedral. A pulpit was also incorporated with the screen dedicated to Sir Winston Churchill. The new chancery was dedicated by the Archbishop of Canterbury Geoffrey Fisher on 2 December 1949 in the presence of Princess Elizabeth. The east side of the cathedral was then transformed into a baptistery. The under-croft, constructed from remains of the basement of the Auberge d'Allemagne was never used. In 1928, the Bishop of Gibraltar Nugent Hicks opened the under-croft as the new parish hall. In 1938, it was transformed into a gas-proof air raid shelter, which in the early days of the conflict was used by the chaplain, his wife and scores of Maltese citizens. In 2005 it was restored and upgraded.

== Interior ==
A Valletta landmark due to its spire rising over 60 metres, it is constructed with Maltese limestone in a neo-classical style. The cathedral has columns with capitals of the Corinthian order while the capitals of the six columns of the portico are of the Ionic order. The internal dimensions of the building are 33.5 metres x 20.4 metres. Behind the main altar is a painting titled Ecce Homo, the work of A E Chalon, lent in 2014.

== Steeple ==
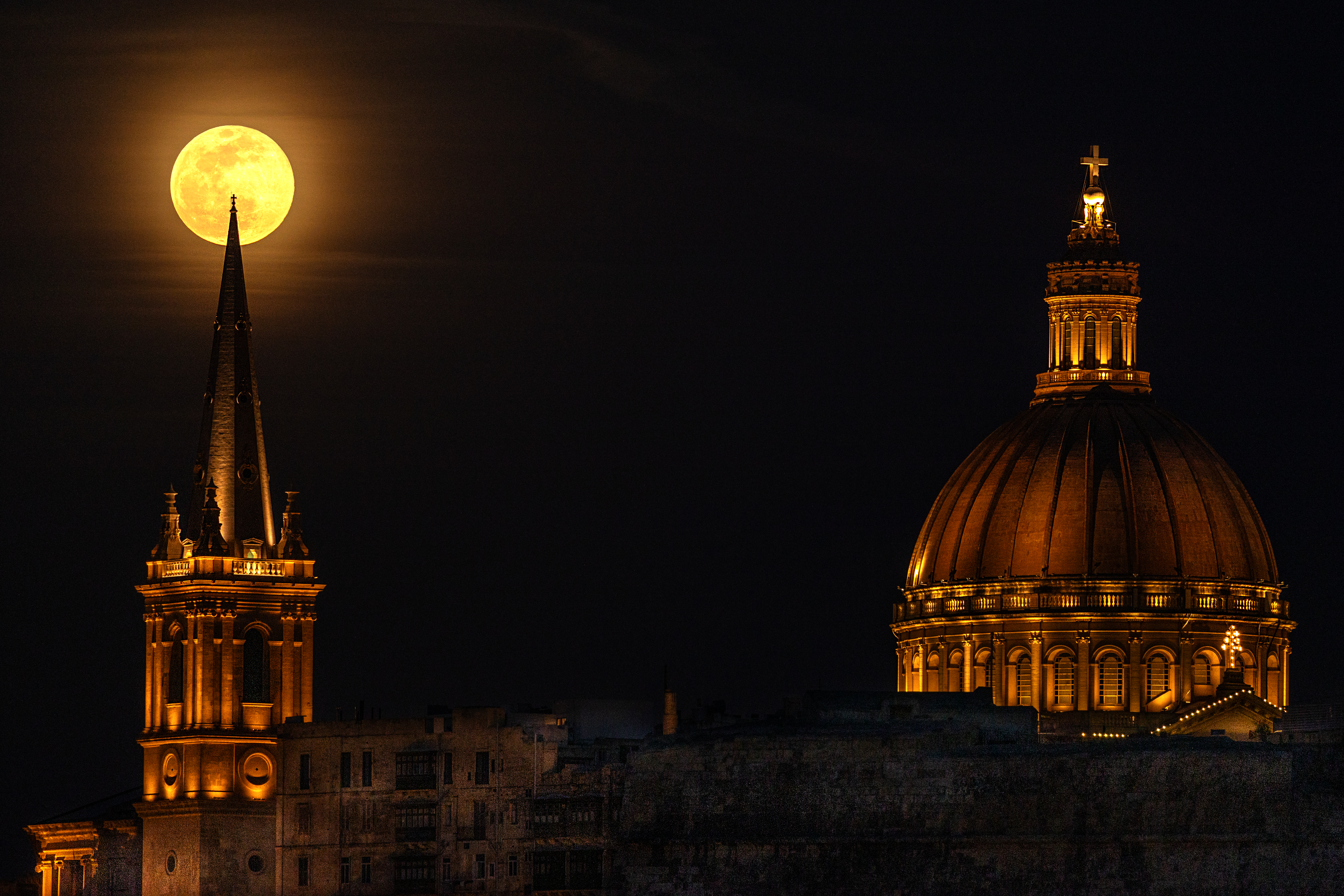
The steeple on the left with the dome of the Carmelite church on the right

The cathedral's steeple is a landmark on its own being notably visible in the Marsamxett Harbour. The church building is listed on the National Inventory of the Cultural Property of the Maltese Islands. On 9 February 2017, the church council launched a project to restore the building and steeple with the aim of raising €3,000,000 to cover the costs. The restoration was completed in 2024, winning a category in the XVIII DIN L-ART ĦELWA ARCHITECTURAL HERITAGE AWARDS.

== Organ ==
Above the entrance to the cathedral is located the organ that originated in Chester Cathedral in northwest England. The one-manual instrument was built in 1684 by Bernard Smith. There is a long-held tradition that it was played by George Frederick Handel when on his way to Dublin for the first public performance of the "Messiah". It is believed he carried out some final rehearsals to fine-tune some of the choruses at Chester Cathedral in 1742 when the organ was housed in the cathedral. However, it has been changed and rebuilt several times, most recently by Kenneth Jones of Dublin.

== Association with British military forces ==
The oak panels around the high altar are a memorial to the Allied units which took part in the defence of Malta between 1940 and 1943. Twelve flags hang in the aisles representing amongst others the Royal Air Force, the British Merchant Navy, and the Royal Navy.

== Chancellors of the cathedral ==
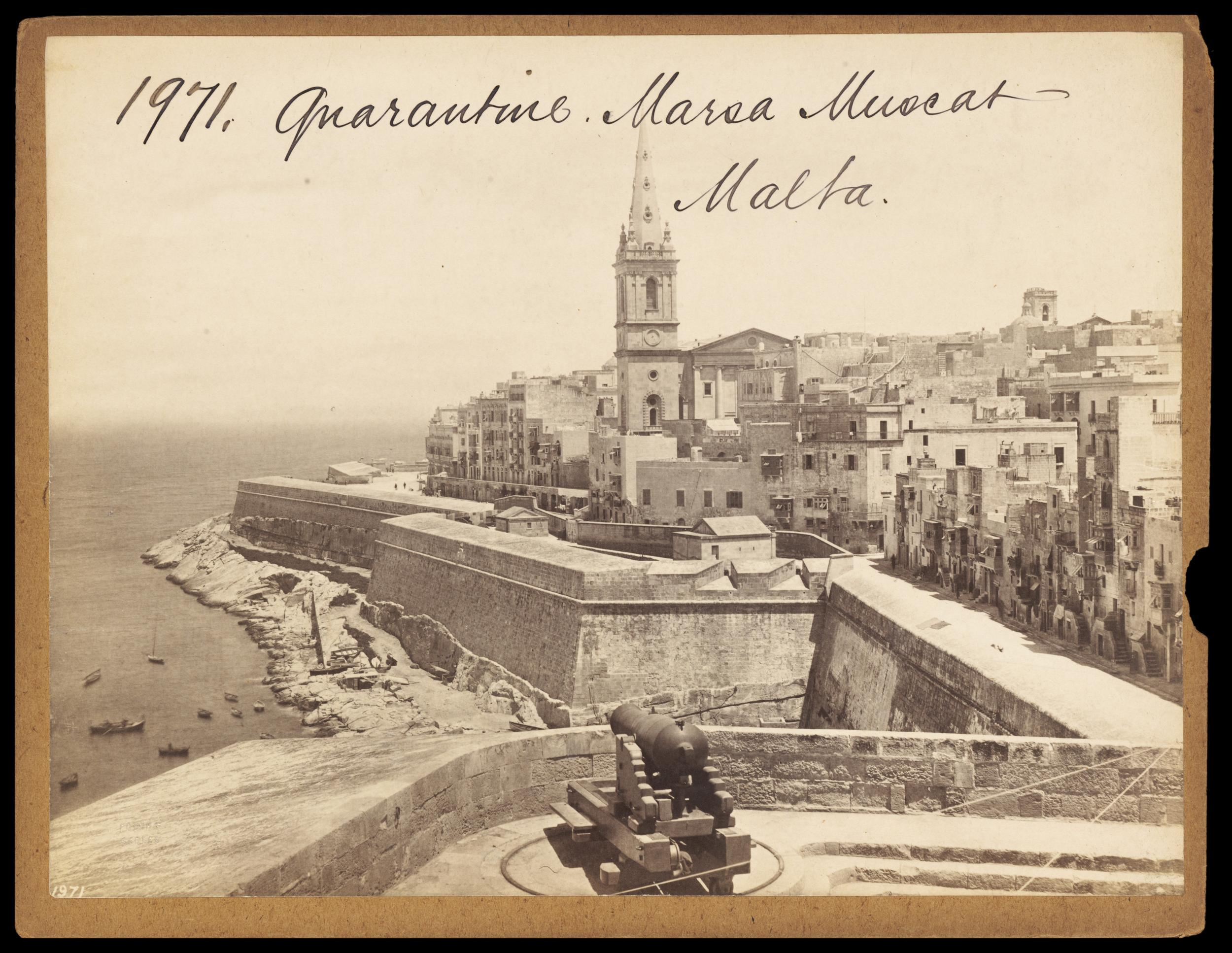
St Paul's Pro-Cathedral in the mid-19th century.

- John Cleugh (1844–1877)
- Henry White (1877–1878)
- Ambrose Hardy (1878–1895)
- Arthur Babington Cartwright (1896–1901)
- Franklyn de Winton Lushington (1901–1903)
- Daniel Collyer (1903–1905)
- Charles Samuel Gustavus Lutz (1905)
- Charles George Gull (1906–1907)
- Walter Naish (1907–1908)
- William Evered (1908–1910)
- Arthur Fowler Newton (1910–1912)
- Frederick Davies Brock (1913–1919)
- Archibald Hugh Conway Fargus (1919–1922)
- Arthur Cyprian Moreton (1922–1926)
- Noel Ambrose Marshall (1926–1931)
- Reginald Morton Nicholls (1931–1944)
- Francis William Hicks (1944–1954)
- Charles Paton (1955–1958)
- Henry Rupert Colton (1959–1963)
- Robert William Pope (1964–1965)
- Launcelot MacManaway (1965–1966)
- Donald Young (1966–1967)
- Henry George Warren MacDonald (1967–1969)
- Gordon Hyslop (1969–1973)
- Howard Cole (1973–1977)
- David Inderwick Strangeways (1977–1981)
- John Walter Evans (1981–1985)
- Kenneth William Alfred Roberts (1986–1989)
- Philip John Cousins (1989–1995)
- Alan Geoffrey Woods (1996–2003)
- Tom Mendel (2004–2008)
- Simon Godfrey (2009-2022)
- David Wright (2023-present).

== See also ==
- List of churches in Malta
- Religion in Malta
- Cathedral of the Holy Trinity, Gibraltar
