= Body politic =

Metaphor comparing a polity to a body

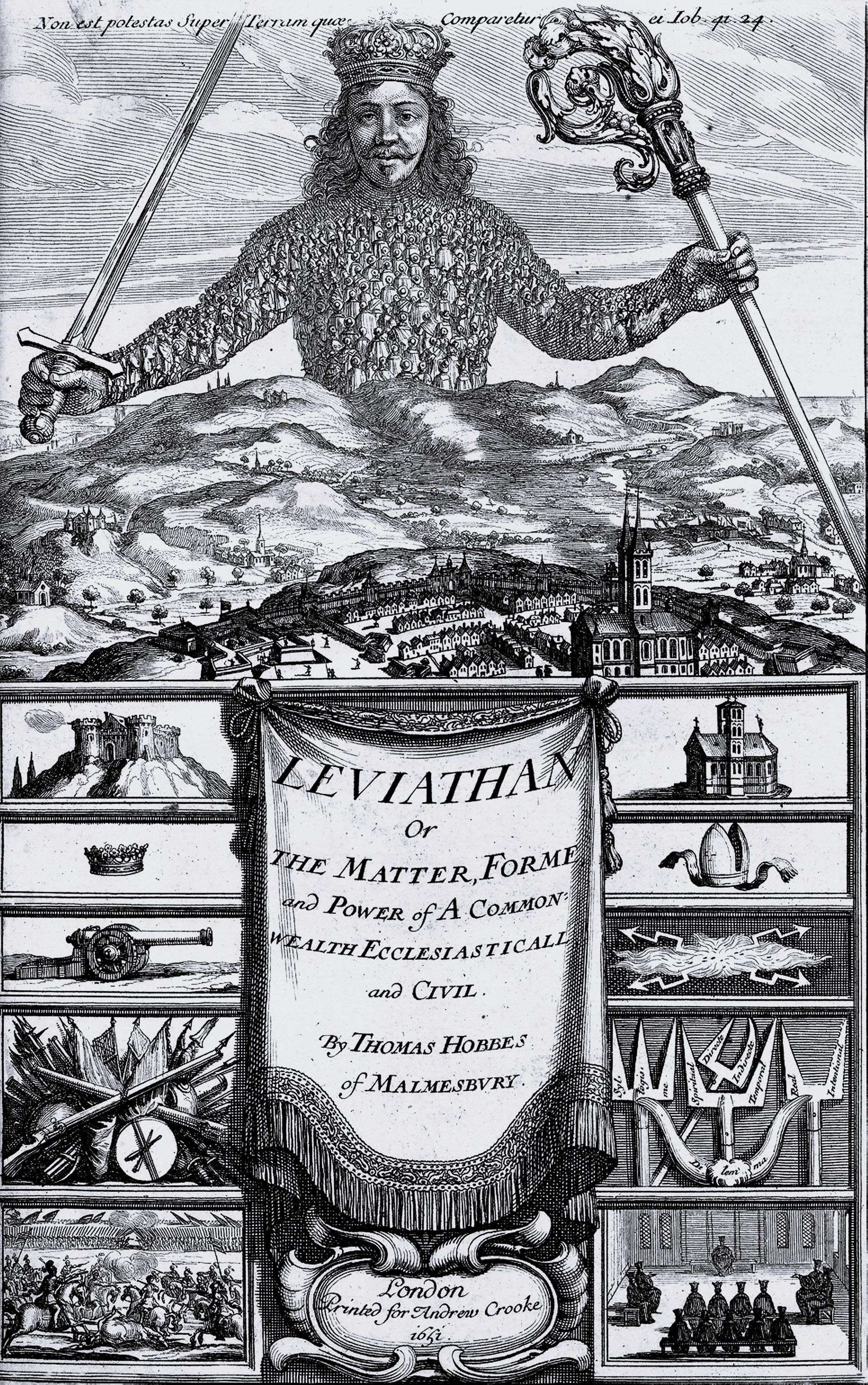
The frontispiece of Hobbes's Leviathan shows a body formed of multitudinous citizens, surmounted by a king's head.

The body politic is a polity—such as a city, realm, or state—considered metaphorically as a physical body. Historically, the sovereign is typically portrayed as the body's head, and the analogy may also be extended to other anatomical parts, as in political readings of Aesop's fable of "The Belly and the Members". The image originates in ancient Greek philosophy, beginning in the 6th century BC, and was later extended in Roman philosophy.

Following the high and late medieval revival of the Byzantine Corpus Juris Civilis in Latin Europe, the "body politic" took on a jurisprudential significance by being identified with the legal theory of the corporation, gaining salience in political thought from the 13th century on. In English law the image of the body politic developed into the theory of the king's two bodies and the Crown as corporation sole.

The metaphor was elaborated further from the Renaissance onwards, as medical knowledge based on Galen was challenged by thinkers such as William Harvey. Analogies were drawn between supposed causes of disease and disorder and their equivalents in the political field, viewed as plagues or infections that might be remedied with purges and nostrums.

The 17th century writings of Thomas Hobbes developed the image of the body politic into a modern theory of the state as an artificial person. Parallel terms deriving from the Latin corpus politicum exist in other European languages.

== Etymology ==
The term body politic derives from Medieval Latin corpus politicum, which itself developed from corpus mysticum, originally designating the Catholic Church as the mystical body of Christ but extended to politics from the 11th century on in the form corpus reipublicae (mysticum), "(mystical) body of the commonwealth". Parallel terms exist in other European languages, such as Italian corpo politico, Polish ciało polityczne, and German Staatskörper ("state body"). An equivalent early modern French term is corps-état; contemporary French uses corps politique.

== History ==
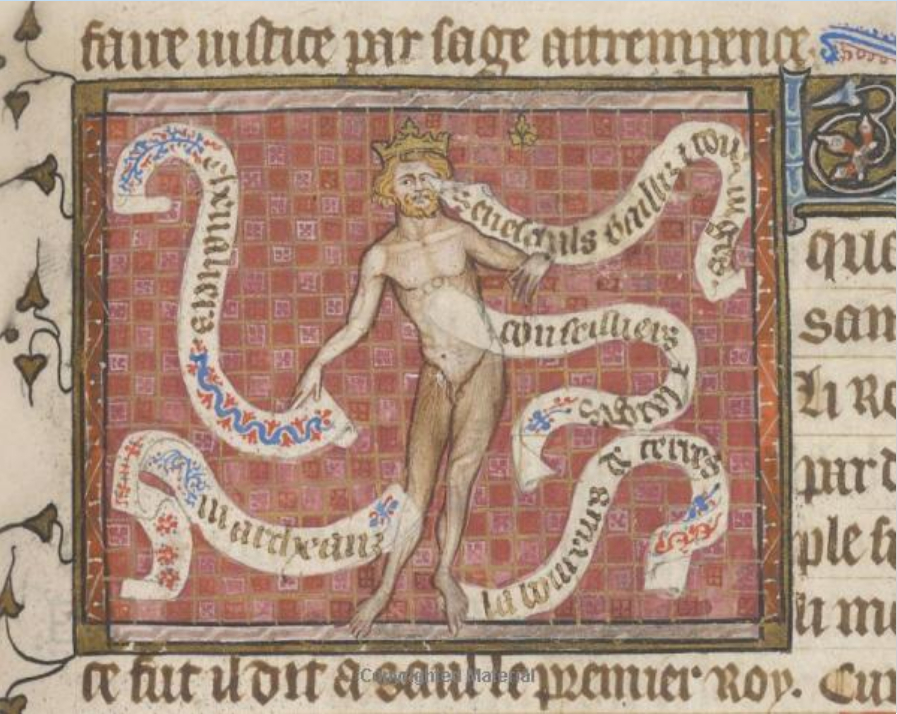
A visualization of the body politic metaphor in a 14th-century French manuscript. The king is head. Next, the seneschals, bailiffs, and provosts and other judges are compared to eyes and ears. The counsellors and wise men are linked to the heart. As defenders of the commonwealth, the knights are the hands. Because of their constant voyages, the merchants are associated with the legs. Finally, laborers, who work close to the earth and support the body, are its feet.

=== Classical philosophy ===
The Western concept of the "body politic", originally meaning a human society considered as a collective body, originated in classical Greek and Roman philosophy. The general metaphor emerged in the 6th century BC, with the Athenian statesman Solon and the poet Theognis describing cities (poleis) in biological terms as "pregnant" or "wounded". Plato's Republic provided one of its most influential formulations. The term itself, however—in Ancient Greek, τῆς πόλεως σῶμα, tēs poleōs sōma, "the body of the state"—appears as such for the first time in the late 4th century Athenian orators Dinarch and Hypereides at the beginning of the Hellenistic era. In these early formulations, the anatomical detail of the body politic was relatively limited: Greek thinkers typically confined themselves to distinguishing the ruler as head of the body, and comparing political stasis, that is, crises of the state, to biological disease.

The image of the body politic occupied a central place in the political thought of the Roman Republic, and the Romans were the first to develop the anatomy of the "body" in full detail, endowing it with nerves, "blood, breath, limbs, and organs". In its origins, the concept was particularly connected to a politicised version of Aesop's fable of "The Belly and the Members", told in relation to the first secessio plebis, the temporary departure of the plebeian order from Rome in 495–93 BC. On the account of the Roman historian Livy, a senator explained the situation to the plebeians by a metaphor: the various members of the Roman body had become angry that the "stomach", the patricians, consumed their labours while providing nothing in return. However, upon their secession, they became feeble and realised that the stomach's digestion had provided them vital energy. Convinced by this story, the plebeians returned to Rome, and the Roman body was made whole and functional. This legend formed a paradigm for "nearly all surviving republican discourse of the body politic".

Late republican orators developed the image further, comparing attacks on Roman institutions to mutilations of the republic's body. During the First Triumvirate in 59 BC, Cicero described the Roman state as "dying of a new sort of disease". Lucan's Pharsalia, written in the early imperial era in the 60s AD, abounded in this kind of imagery. Depicting the dictator Sulla as a surgeon out of control who had butchered the Roman body politic in the process of cutting out its putrefied limbs, Lucan used vivid organic language to portray the decline of the Roman Republic as a literal process of decay, its seas and rivers becoming choked with blood and gore.

=== Medieval usage ===
The metaphor of the body politic remained in use after the fall of the Western Roman Empire. The Neoplatonist Islamic philosopher al-Farabi, known in the West as Alpharabius, discussed the image in his work The Perfect State (c. 940), stating, "The excellent city resembles the perfect and healthy body, all of whose limbs cooperate to make the life of the animal perfect". John of Salisbury gave it a definitive Latin high medieval form in his Policraticus around 1159: the king was the body's head; the priest was the soul; the councillors were the heart; the eyes, ears, and tongue were the magistrates of the law; one hand, the army, held a weapon; the other, without a weapon, was the realm's justice. The body's feet were the common people. Each member of the body had its vocation, and each was beholden to work in harmony for the benefit of the whole body.

In the Late Middle Ages, the concept of the corporation, a legal person made up of a group of real individuals, gave the idea of a body politic judicial significance. The corporation had emerged in imperial Roman law under the name universitas, and a formulation of the concept attributed to Ulpian was collected in the 6th century Digest of Justinian I during the early Byzantine era. The Digest, along with the other parts of Justinian's Corpus Juris Civilis, became the bedrock of medieval civil law upon its recovery and annotation by the glossators beginning in the 11th century. It remained for the glossators' 13th century successors, the commentators—especially Baldus de Ubaldis—to develop the idea of the corporation as a persona ficta, a fictive person, and apply the concept to human societies as a whole.

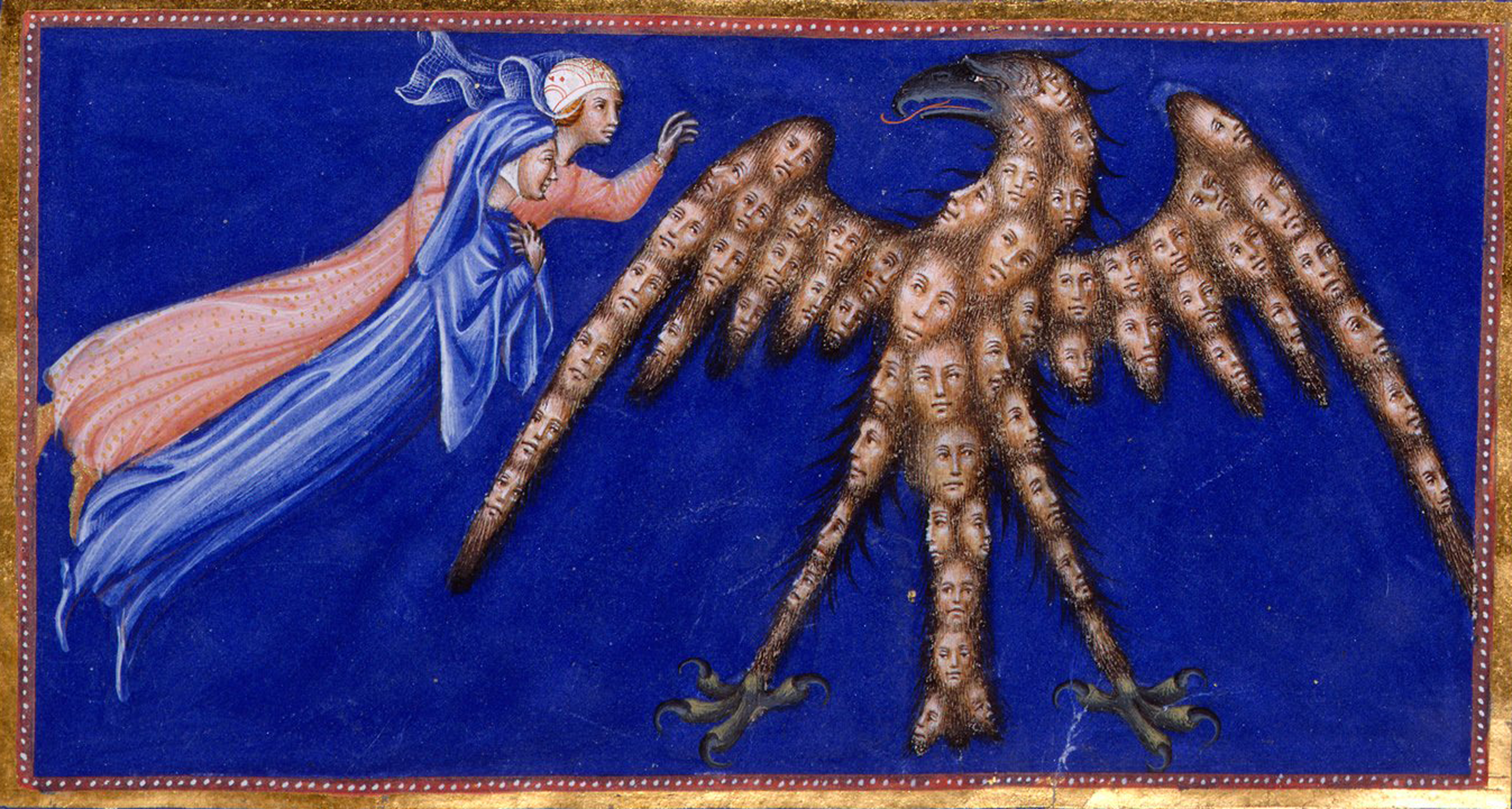
The imperial eagle in Dante's Paradiso, depicted by Giovanni di Paolo in the 1440s

Where his jurist predecessor Bartolus of Saxoferrato conceived the corporation in essentially legal terms, Baldus expressly connected the corporation theory to the ancient, biological and political concept of the body politic. For Baldus, not only was man, in Aristotelian terms, a "political animal", but the whole populus, the body of the people, formed a type of political animal in itself: a populus "has government as part of [its] existence, just as every animal is ruled by its own spirit and soul". Baldus equated the body politic with the respublica, the state or realm, stating that it "cannot die, and for this reason it is said that it has no heir, because it always lives on in itself". From here, the image of the body politic became prominent in the medieval imagination. In Canto XVIII of his Paradiso, for instance, Dante, writing in the early 14th century, presents the Roman Empire as a corporate body in the form of an imperial eagle, its body made of souls. The French court writer Christine de Pizan discussed the concept at length in her Book of the Body Politic (1407).

The idea of the body politic, rendered in legal terms through corporation theory, also drew natural comparison to the theological concept of the church as a corpus mysticum, the mystical body of Christ. The concept of the people as a corpus mysticum also featured in Baldus, and the idea that the realm of France was a corpus mysticum formed an important part of late medieval French jurisprudence. Jean de Terrevermeille, around 1418–19, described the French laws of succession as established by the "whole civic or mystical body of the realm", and the Parlement of Paris in 1489 proclaimed itself a "mystical body" composed of both ecclesiastics and laymen, representing the "body of the king". From at least the 14th century, the doctrine developed that the French kings were mystically married to the body politic; at the coronation of Henry II in 1547, he was said to have "solemnly married his realm". The English jurist John Fortescue also invoked the "mystical body" in his De Laudibus Legum Angliae (c. 1470): just as a physical body is "held together by the nerves", the mystical body of the realm is held together by the law, and

Just as the physical body grows out of the embryo, regulated by one head, so does there issue from the people the kingdom, which exists as a corpus mysticum governed by one man as head.

=== The king's body politic ===
==== In England ====
In Tudor and Stuart England, the concept of the body politic was given a peculiar additional significance through the idea of the king's two bodies, the doctrine discussed by the German-American medievalist Ernst Kantorowicz in his eponymous work. This legal doctrine held that the monarch had two bodies: the physical "king body natural" and the immortal "King body politic". Upon the "demise" of an individual king, his body natural fell away, but the body politic lived on. This was an indigenous development of English law without a precise equivalent in the rest of Europe. Extending the identification of the body politic as a corporation, English jurists argued that the Crown was a "corporation sole": a corporation made up of one body politic that was at the same time the body of the realm and its parliamentary estates, and also the body of the royal dignity itself—two concepts of the body politic that were conflated and fused.

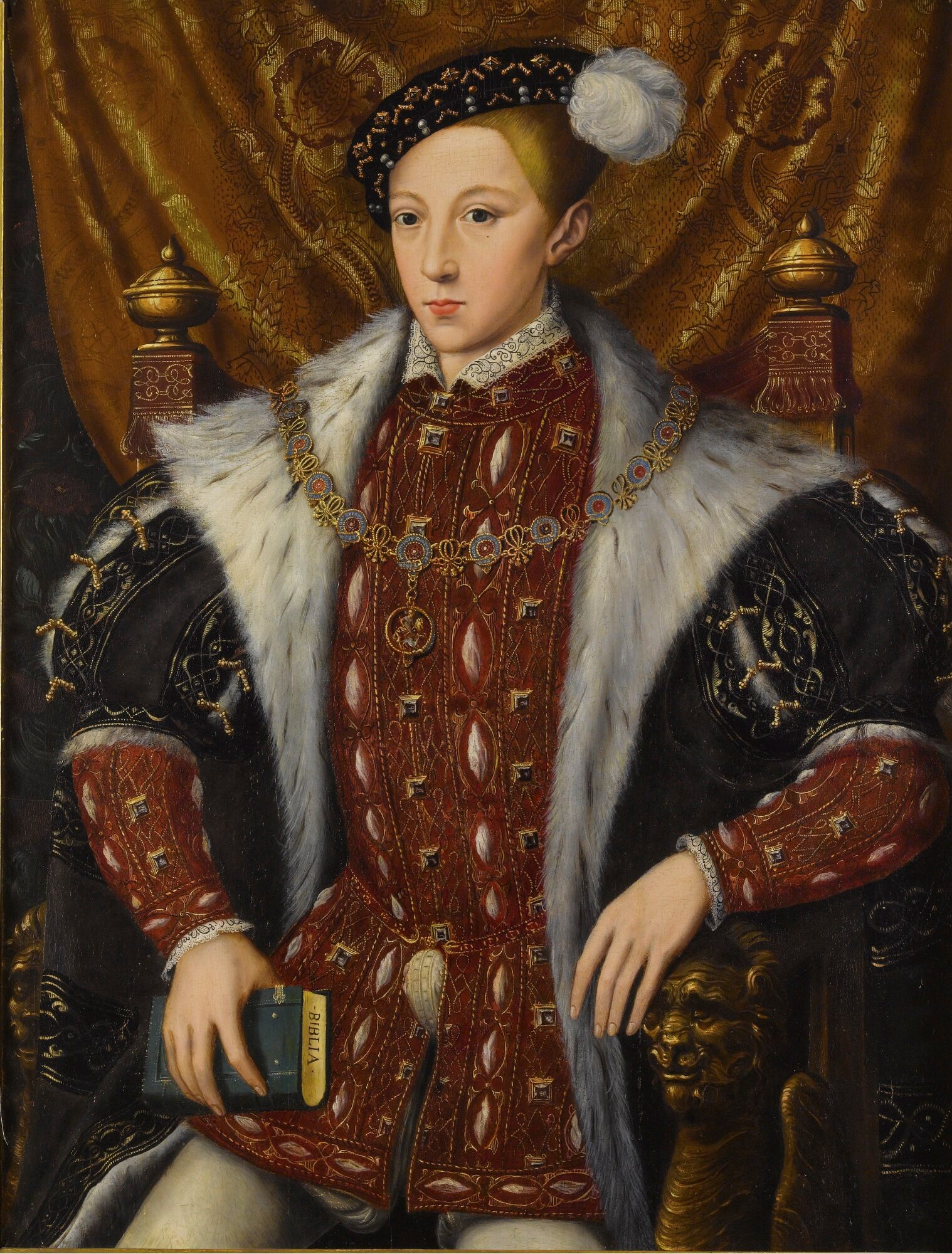
Elizabethan jurists held that the immaturity of Edward VI's body natural was expunged by his body politic.

The development of the doctrine of the king's two bodies can be traced in the Reports of Edmund Plowden. In the 1561 Case of the Duchy of Lancaster, which concerned whether an earlier gift of land made by Edward VI could be voided on account of his "nonage", that is, his immaturity, the judges held that it could not: the king's "Body politic, which is annexed to his Body natural, takes away the Imbecility of his Body natural". The king's body politic, then, "that cannot be seen or handled", annexes the body natural and "wipes away" all its defects. What was more, the body politic rendered the king immortal as an individual: as the judges in the case Hill v. Grange argued in 1556, once the king had made an act, "he as King never dies, but the King, in which Name it has Relation to him, does ever continue"—thus, they held, Henry VIII was still "alive", a decade after his physical death.

The doctrine of the two bodies could serve to limit the powers of the real king. When Edward Coke, Chief Justice of the Common Pleas at the time, reported the way in which judges had differentiated the bodies in 1608, he noted that it was the "natural body" of the king that was created by God—the "politic body", by contrast, was "framed by the policy of man". In the Case of Prohibitions of the same year, Coke denied the king "in his own person" any right to administer justice or order arrests. Finally, in its declaration of 27 May 1642 shortly before the start of the English Civil War, Parliament drew on the theory to invoke the powers of the body politic of Charles I against his body natural, stating:

What they [Parliament] do herein, hath the Stamp of Royal Authority, although His Majesty seduced by evil Counsel, do in His own Person, oppose, or interrupt the same. For the King's Supreme Power, and Royal Pleasure, is exercised and declared in this High Court of Law, and Council, after a more eminent and obligatory manner, than it can be by any personal Act or Resolution of His Own.

The 18th century jurist William Blackstone, in Book I of his Commentaries on the Laws of England (1765), summarised the doctrine of the king's body politic as it subsequently developed after the Restoration: the king "in his political capacity" manifests "absolute perfection"; he can "do no wrong", nor even is he capable of "thinking wrong"; he can have no defect, and is never in law "a minor or under age". Indeed, Blackstone says, if an heir to the throne should accede while "attainted of treason or felony", his assumption of the crown "would purge the attainder ipso facto". The king manifests "absolute immortality": "Henry, Edward, or George may die; but the king survives them all". Soon after the appearance of the Commentaries, however, Jeremy Bentham mounted an extensive attack on Blackstone which the historian Quentin Skinner describes as "almost lethal" to the theory: legal fictions like the body politic, Bentham argued, were conducive to royal absolutism and should be entirely avoided in law. Bentham's position dominated later British legal thinking, and though aspects of the theory of the body politic would survive in subsequent jurisprudence, the idea of the Crown as a corporation sole was widely critiqued.

In the late 19th century, Frederic William Maitland revived the legal discourse of the king's two bodies, arguing that the concept of the Crown as corporation sole had originated from the amalgamation of medieval civil law with the law of church property. He proposed, in contrast, to view the Crown as an ordinary corporation aggregate, that is, a corporation of many people, with a view to describing the legal personhood of the state.

==== In France ====
A related but contrasting concept in France was the doctrine termed by Sarah Hanley the king's one body, summarised by Jean Bodin in his own 1576 pronouncement that "the king never dies". Rather than distinguishing the immortal body politic from the mortal body natural of the king, as in the English theory, the French doctrine conflated the two, arguing that the Salic law had established a single king body politic and natural that constantly regenerated through the biological reproduction of the royal line. The body politic, on this account, was biological and necessarily male, and 15th century French jurists such as Jean Juvénal des Ursins argued on this basis for the exclusion of female heirs to the crown—since, they argued, the king of France was a "virile office". In the ancien régime, the king's heir was held to assimilate the body politic of the old king in a physical "transfer of corporeality" upon his accession.

=== In the United States ===
James I in the second charter for Virginia, as well as both the Plymouth and Massachusetts Charter, grant body politic.

=== Hobbesian state theory ===
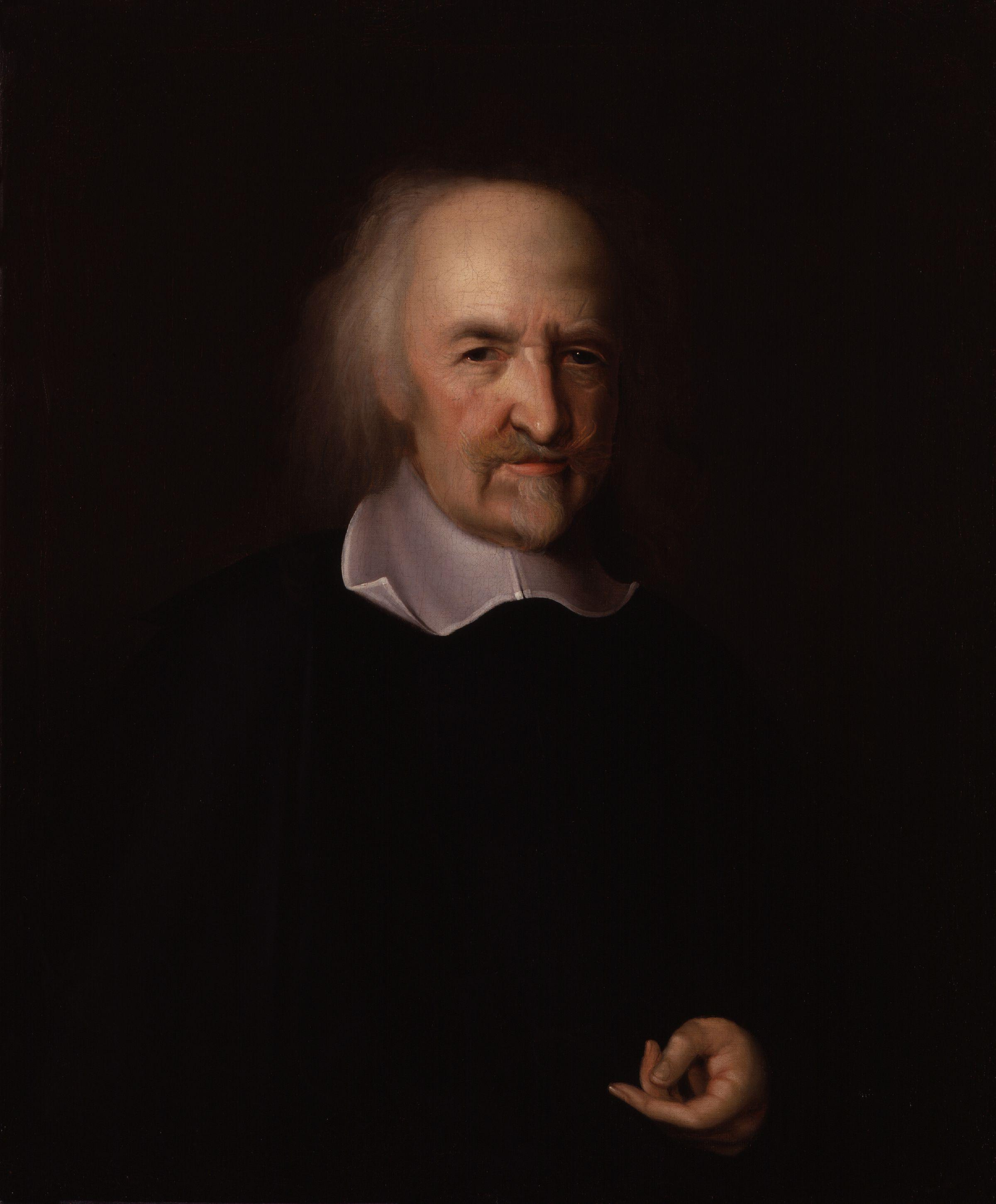
Thomas Hobbes, c. 1669–70

Aside from the doctrine of the king's two bodies, the conventional image of the whole of the realm as a body politic had also remained in use in Stuart England: James I compared the office of the king to "the office of the head towards the body". Upon the outbreak of the English Civil War in 1642, however, parliamentarians such as William Bridge put forward the argument that the "ruling power" belonged originally to "the whole people or body politicke", who could revoke it from the monarch. The execution of Charles I in 1649 made necessary a radical revision of the whole concept. In 1651, Thomas Hobbes's Leviathan made a decisive contribution to this effect, reviving the concept while endowing it with new features. Against the parliamentarians, Hobbes maintained that sovereignty was absolute and the head could certainly not be "of lesse power" than the body of the people; against the royal absolutists, however, he developed the idea of a social contract, emphasising that the body politic—Leviathan, the "mortal god"—was fictional and artificial rather than natural, derived from an original decision by the people to constitute a sovereign.

Hobbes's theory of the body politic exercised an important influence on subsequent political thinkers, who both repeated and modified it. Republican partisans of the Commonwealth presented alternative figurations of the metaphor in defence of the parliamentarian model. James Harrington, in his 1656 Commonwealth of Oceana, argued that "the delivery of a Model Government ... is no less than political Anatomy"; it must "imbrace all those Muscles, Nerves, Arterys and Bones, which are necessary to any Function of a well order'd Commonwealth". Invoking William Harvey's recent discovery of the circulatory system, Harrington presented the body politic as a dynamic system of political circulation, comparing his ideal bicameral legislature, for example, to the ventricles of the human heart. In contrast to Hobbes, the "head" was once more dependent on the people: the execution of the law must follow the law itself, so that "Leviathan may see, that the hand or sword that executeth the Law is in it, and not above it". In Germany, Samuel von Pufendorf recapitulated Hobbes's explanation of the origin of the state as a social contract, but extended his notion of personhood to argue that the state must be a specifically moral person with a rational nature, and not simply coercive power.

In the 18th century, Hobbes's theory of the state as an artificial body politic gained wide acceptance both in Britain and continental Europe. Thomas Pownall, later the British governor of Massachusetts and a proponent of American liberty, drew on Hobbes's theory in his 1752 Principles of Polity to argue that "the whole Body politic" should be conceived as "one Person"; states were "distinct Persons and independent". At around the same time, the Swiss jurist Emer de Vattel pronounced that "states are bodies politic", "moral persons" with their own "understanding and ... will", a statement that would become accepted international law.

The tension between organic understandings of the body politic and theories emphasizing its artificial character formed a theme in English political debates in this period. Writing in 1780, during the American Revolutionary War, the British reformist John Cartwright emphasised the artificial and immortal character of the body politic in order to refute the use of biological analogies in conservative rhetoric. Arguing that it was better conceived as a machine operating by the "due action and re-action of the ... springs of the constitution" than a human body, he termed "the body politic" a "careless figurative expression": "It is not corporeal ... not formed from the dust of the earth. It is purely intellectual; and its life-spring is truth."

== Modern law ==
The English term "body politic" is sometimes used in modern legal contexts to describe a type of legal person, typically the state itself or an entity connected to it. A body politic is a type of taxable legal person in British law, for example, and likewise a class of legal person in Indian law. In the United States, a municipal corporation is considered a body politic, as opposed to a private body corporate. The U.S. Supreme Court affirmed the theory of the state as an artificial body politic in the 1851 case Cotton v. United States, declaring that "every sovereign State is of necessity a body politic, or artificial person, and as such capable of making contracts and holding property, both real and personal", and differentiated the United States' powers as a sovereign from its rights as a body politic.

== See also ==
- Social organism, the concept in sociology
- Volkskörper, the German "national body"
- Lex animata, the king as the "living law"
- Kokutai, a related Japanese concept
- Royal we
