= St Michael's Church, Upton =

Coordinates: 52.2356°N 0.9508°W

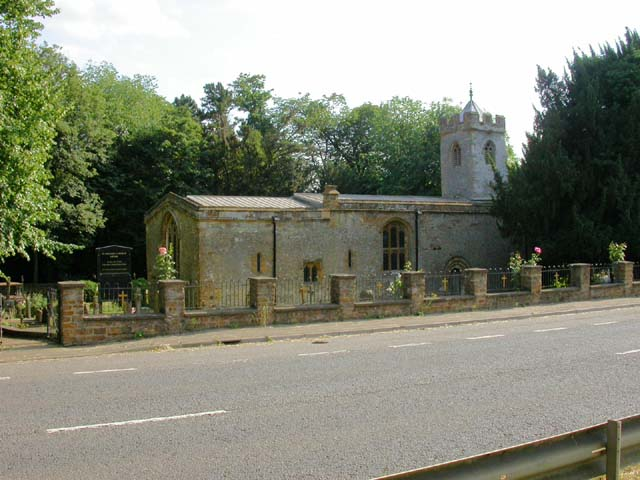
- St Michael's Church, Upton, from the northeast

- Location in Northamptonshire
- Location: Upton, Northamptonshire
- Country: England
- Denomination: Anglican
- Website: Churches Conservation Trust

History
- Dedication: Saint Michael

Architecture
- Functional status: Redundant
- Heritage designation: Grade I
- Designated: 3 May 1968
- Architectural type: Church
- Style: Norman, Gothic, Gothic Revival
- Groundbreaking: 12th century
- Completed: 1893

Specifications
- Materials: Limestone, lead roofs

St Michael's Church is a redundant Anglican church in Upton, Northamptonshire, England (grid reference SP717602). This was formerly a separate hamlet, and is now part of the town of Northampton. The church is recorded in the National Heritage List for England as a designated Grade I listed building, and is under the care of the Churches Conservation Trust. The church stands alongside the A45 road, adjacent to the grounds of the former Upton Hall.

== Early history ==
St Michael's was built originally as a private chapel to the lord of the manor and it is thought that the present church was built between 1158 and 1189. Alterations were made to it between the 13th and 15th centuries, including the addition of the tower in the 14th century and a porch in 1594. The church was restored in 1892–93 by M. H. Holding. It was declared redundant on 1 January 1981, and was vested in the Churches Conservation Trust on 21 December 1988.

== Architecture ==
=== Exterior ===
The church is constructed in coursed limestone rubble. It has dressings in limestone and ironstone, and lead roofs. Its plan consists of a nave with a south porch, a chancel, and a west tower. The tower is set within the west end of the nave, and has two-light bell openings on each side, a battlemented parapet, and a pyramidal roof with a finial and a wrought iron weathervane. On the west side of the tower, facing Upton Hall, is a stair turret, above which is an octagonal clock face. Over the nave and chancel walls is a plain parapet. The east window in the chancel has three lights and Decorated tracery. In the north wall is a small lancet window and, to the west of this, a two-light Perpendicular window that was inserted in 1892. On the south side of the chancel is a round-headed priest's door, and to the west of this are two-light windows. In both the north and south walls of the nave are Norman round-headed doorways. Also in the north wall is a three-light Perpendicular window, also from 1892, and two single-light round-headed windows. In the south wall are two-light Perpendicular windows, and on each side of the roof of the porch is a small quatrefoil window. The porch has a Tudor arched doorway. On the east side of the porch is a circular window, and there is a rectangular window on its west side. In the gable of the porch is a blank shield with the date 1592 to the left, the initials HC on the right and VK (for Valentine Knightley) above. In the west front of the church are lancet windows on each side of the tower, and a canted stair turret. There is a mass dial (a form of sundial) to the east of the priest's door, another in the west wall, and a third in the porch.

=== Interior ===
Internally there is no division between the nave and the chancel. The reredos, choir stalls, desks and pulpit are all made from Riga oak and were designed in 1899 by M. H. Holding. In the church is a 17th-century parish chest. The vestry contains a 17th-century communion table which was replaced by a new altar in 1907. In the south wall of the chancel is a recess that probably formerly contained a piscina. There are aumbries in the north and east walls. The stained glass in the east window dates from 1870. On the walls are four hatchments. There are a number of tombs and memorials in the church, many commemorating the Samwell family. These include a wall monument to Sir Thomas Samwell, 2nd Baronet who died in 1757. Also in the church is a tomb chest with alabaster effigies of Richard Knightley, who died in 1537, and his wife. In addition there is a slate wall memorial to James Harrington, the author of The Commonwealth of Oceana, who died in 1677 and is buried in St Margaret's, Westminster.

== External features ==
The churchyard contains a number of old graves. One of these designated as a Grade II listed building; it is a headstone dated 1672, and is made from ironstone. In the area around the churchyard are mounds which are the remains of a deserted medieval village.

== Recent history and present day ==
St Michael's continued to be a chapel of ease to St Peter's Church, Northampton, until 1966. It was closed for regular worship in 1980. The churchyard is maintained by a group of local people known as the Friends of St Michael's, and seasonal services continue to be held in the church. Quinton House School now occupies Upton Hall; the school helps with the upkeep of the church, and holds occasional services for the pupils.

== See also ==
- List of churches preserved by the Churches Conservation Trust in the English Midlands
- List of churches in Northampton
