= John Streater =

English soldier, political writer and printer

John Streater (died 1687) was an English soldier, political writer and printer. An opponent of Oliver Cromwell, Streater was a "key republican critic of the regime" He was a leading example of the "commonwealthmen", one division among the English republicans of the period, along with James Harrington, Edmund Ludlow, and Henry Nevile.

== Republican ==
He was in the Parliamentary forces from 1642, seeing action at the Battle of Edgehill and Battle of Newbury. He served in the Parliamentary army in Ireland, as a quarter-master and engineer.

He made a direct reply in 1653, "Christ must come before Christmas, or else he will come too late", to Cromwell's supporter Thomas Harrison, who said that Cromwell sought not for himself but that "King Jesus might take the sceptre". This comes from James Heath, Flagellum: or, the Life and death, birth and burial of Oliver Cromwell (1663), and is considered "rather dubious" by Austin Woolrych.

In 1654 he started a serial publication, Observations Historical, Political. and Philosophical. It ran for 11 issues, from 4 April to 4 July. It argued for annual elections. Taking the form of commentary on the Politics of Aristotle, it broached many topics such as censorship, free speech and right of assembly, with views on the family and criticism of the paternalist theories of divine right.

Streater has been seen as taking radical ideas, such as those suppressed with the Levellers, onto a new plane:

... Streater was making his republicanism occupy the space filled in the 1640s by Leveller ideas. The older generation of Levellers struggled to reach his position by incorporating ideas from classical republicanism.

He fell into considerable trouble for his opposition to Cromwell, but found a protector in John Desborough. He was arrested under a writ of Parliament, and argued a habeas corpus case, unsuccessfully, but using Sir Edward Coke's approach. A pamphleteer publicised the case (1654). His eventual release in early 1654 was because Parliament was dissolved.

In the political confusion of 1659, he argued once more a republican line: against tweaking the Protectorate, against single-person rule, against forms of Senate or "standing council". He also was commissioned as a colonel by Parliament.

== Printer ==
He published The Commonwealth of Oceana in 1656.

With John Macock he styled himself a printer to Parliament in 1659 and 1660. After the Restoration he became a successful commercial printer, in particular with titles by Nicholas Culpeper from the backlist of Peter Cole who committed suicide in 1665. He had a specific exemption from the 1662 Act regulating publishers.

== Works ==
- A Glympse of that Jewel (1653)
- Perfect and Impartial Intelligence (1654)
- A Seasonable Advertisement to the People of England (1659)
- A Shield against the Parthian Dart (1659)
- Secret Reasons of State (1659)
