= Joshua Barnes =

British classical scholar (1654–1712)

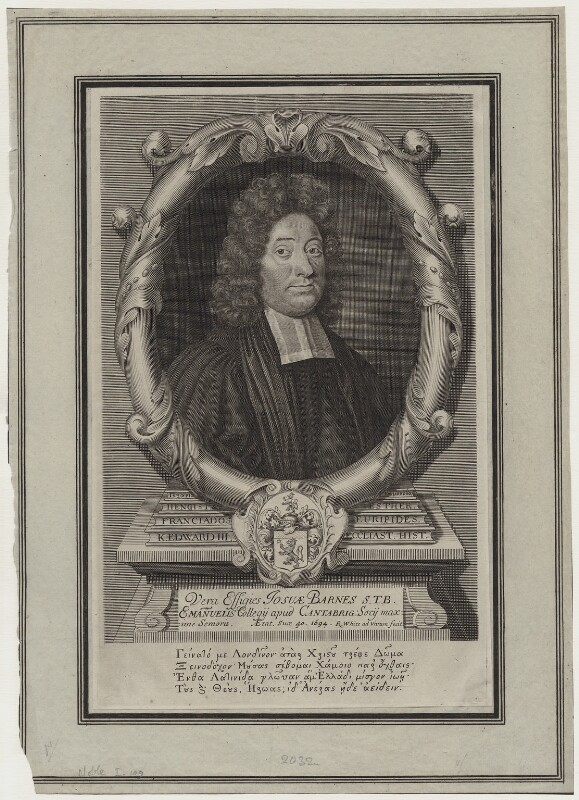
- Born: 10 January 1654; London
- Died: 3 August 1712 (aged 58)
- Occupation: Classical scholar, antiquarian
- Position held: Regius Professor of Greek (1675–1712)

Joshua Barnes (10 January 1654 – 3 August 1712), was an English scholar. His work Gerania; a New Discovery of a Little Sort of People, anciently discoursed of, called Pygmies (1675) was a utopian romance.

== Life and work ==
Barnes was born in London, the son of Edward Barnes, a merchant taylor. Educated at Christ's Hospital and Emmanuel College, Cambridge, he was chosen in 1695 as Regius Professor of Greek, a language which he wrote and spoke with facility.

One of his early publications was Gerania; a New Discovery of a Little Sort of People, anciently discoursed of, called Pygmies (1675), a whimsical sketch, to which Swift's Voyage to Lilliput may owe something. Among his other works is a History of that Most Victorious Monarch Edward III (1688), an epic of over 900 pages, which inserts elaborate speeches into the narrative. He also produced editions of Euripides (1694), Homer (1711), and Anacreon (1705), of which the last contains titles of Greek verses of his own, which he hoped to publish. He was elected a Fellow of the Royal Society in November, 1710.

Barnes married a widow named Mrs Mafon in 1700. Barnes died on 3 August 1712 at Hemingford, near St Ives, Huntingdonshire where his widow erected a monument to him.

== Fiction writer ==
The present-day scholar Robert Ignatius Letellier considers Gerania, a work of prose fiction, to have been part of an emerging type of adventure novels, featuring an "imaginary voyage into alien or fictional regions". These combined first-person adventure narratives with either "satirical social observation" or perceptions of ideal human behaviour in remote lands, following a tradition rooted in the Utopia (1516) of Thomas More, which found prominent manifestations in The Blazing World (1666) of Margaret Cavendish, Duchess of Newcastle-upon-Tyne and The Isle of Pines of Henry Neville. The tradition would lead to later works, such as the Robinson Crusoe (1719) of Daniel Defoe.

== Sources ==
- Letellier, Robert Ignatius (1997), The English Novel, 1660-1700: An Annotated Bibliography, Greenwood Publishing Group, ISBN 978-0313303685
