= Rota Club =

Debating society in 17th century London

The Rota Club was a debate society of learned gentlemen who debated republican ideology in London between November 1659 and February 1660. The Club was founded and dominated by James Harrington. It began during the English Interregnum (1649–1660) and lasted until the early months of the Restoration (1660).

== Origins ==
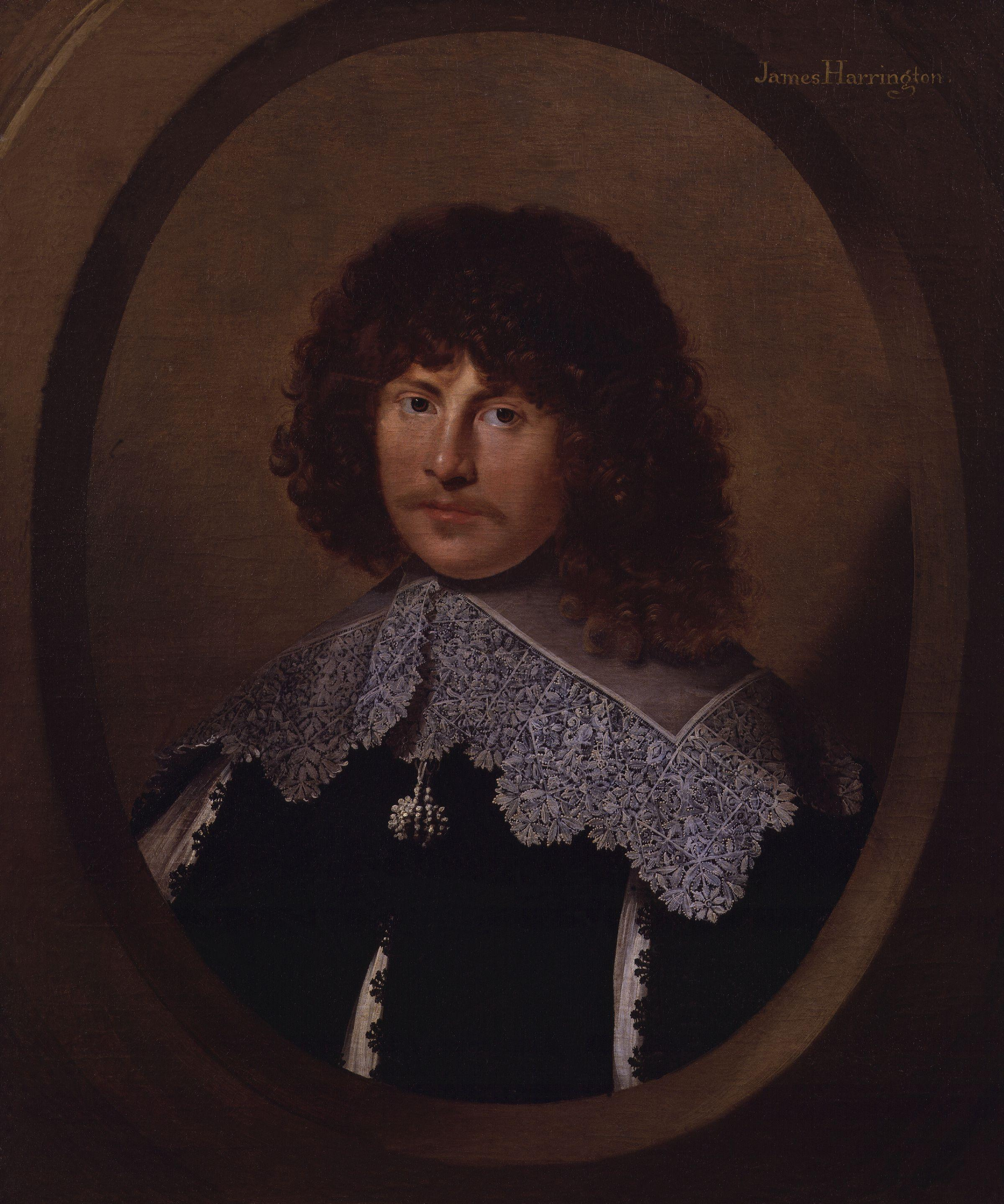
Portrait of James Harrington, oil on canvas, ca.1635

The Rota Club owes its creation to James Harrington. This aristocratic author had been using English Coffee houses since as early as 1656 to promote his works of republican political philosophy, such as The Commonwealth of Oceana (which was released in 1656), and was well received in these venues. In the summer of 1659 however a more serious and organized kind of discussion was instituted in the Bow Street Club. This club met at John Wildman's tavern and was frequented by Harrington's close friends and followers. Their discussion revolved around the republican politics of its members and how to propagate their ideas into the public. This club was short lived and in October or November 1659 Harrington made the decision to form the Rota Club to further advertise his republican ideas.

The Rota Club met at Miles' Coffeehouse at the Turk's Head in the Palace Yard. Its location in one of these new establishments is of some importance. The English coffeehouse was gaining in popularity at this time as it provided a place of sobriety to stage enlightening conversations and debates. As a result, Harrington saw moving the Rota Club into the coffeehouse as hugely beneficial. In the past such assemblies of men had met in taverns, but the introduction of the exotic coffee in England allowed for a different sort of meeting based on moderation and conversation.

Harrington may have based the Rota Club after the Italian Academies he had seen on his travels through Europe. Such an organization would have been interesting to the Virtuosi, a class of men in England at this time, who were a conscious replication of a similar class of Italian gentlemen. They certainly were interested in the exotic new coffee house and were frequenters of this club (and the Bow Street Club).

The Rota Club was named after Harrington's obsession with political rotation, though the specific form of political rotation seems to have had one of two origins. The first possibility is that the name 'Rota' came from the rotation of ministers in seats of government which figured prominently in Harrington's Utopian work Oceana as a means to ensure experienced members were always present while at the same time ministers were switched out to prevent a consolidation of unbalanced power. Another possibility is that the Rota Club derived its name from the revolving contrivances used for ballot voting in papal elections, and the ballot box used in the Rota Club itself. Either way the name 'Rota' referred to a republican or more democratic method of governance than monarchy.

== Social composition ==
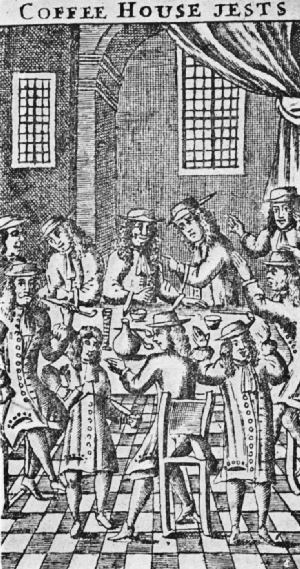
A 17th century coffeehouse

The Rota Club as an institution seems to have had a wide variety of social classes in attendance. It was open to all, ranging from bohemians, aristocrats, officers, soldiers, merchants and other parts of society. The only stipulation for attendance was a fee to be paid, which did limit attendance to those who could afford it but also allowed for a wide range of persons who would not usually have access to such venues. This freedom of attendance allowed for the Rota Club no truly fixed membership as there was a free flow of individuals, those who sat in one meeting would not necessarily be there at the next one. For instance Samuel Pepys, a known member of the Rota Club through his diary, records a fairly sparse attendance. In some periods he records attending the debates once every third or fourth night, followed by long periods of time with no mention of the society at all.

This freedom of attendance and membership did however allow very large groups of men to meet, filling the Rota Club's room at Miles' Coffeehouse on any given night. The size of the group allowed that many of these men were spectators to the debate which would have had relatively few direct participants. For these spectators the Rota Club was a novelty, and a popular one at that. This high attendance operated as a stage for Harrington's republican ideas to play and gain ground.

However, there was a core group who carried out most of the debate between themselves. Among these more notable and regularly attending members of the Rota Club were John Aubrey, Samuel Pepys, Henry Neville, Major Wildman, Francis Cradoc, Edward Bagshaw, William Croone, Philip Carteret, Maximilian Petty, Sir John Hoskyns, and Roger Coke. These were men from a wide array of backgrounds, much like the general attendance themselves. They were antiquarians, authors, members of parliament, Justices of the Peace, military officers, theologians, future New World governors, and aristocrats. In general they were Harrington's republican disciples and the virtuosi, well educated and attracted to the free flow of ideas and intellectual debate. They, like the mass of spectators, would not have attended every night, with the exception of Harrington himself, but they did play significant parts.

Those of differing views on any topic were encouraged to attend, and Harrington himself sought out men of every kind of viewpoint.

== Politics of the Rota Club ==
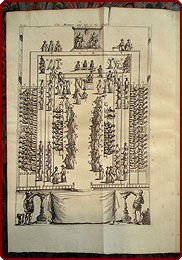
The Government of Harrington's Oceana

The politics of the Rota Club are primarily those seen in its founding. As a club dedicated to the popularization of Harrington's Oceana and republicanism it was primarily a place of discussion for democratic ideals. However the type of republicanism was important as not everyone agreed with Harrington's views. It was not unusual to hear a debate which contradicted Harrington's views. Samual Pepys records one debate where he heard "a good argument against Mr. Harrington's assertion that overbalance of propriety was the foundation of government." The building block on which the Rota Club styled its political debates was that of separating itself from practical politics. This was an arena distinct from the parliament in that it debated theoretical political philosophy. Harrington, in using the Rota club to propagate his ideas on government, felt that it was enough to simply allow his philosophy to enter the political debates of the day. He felt that once these theories were properly understood they would filter into the practical (parliamentary) government of their own accord. During his interrogation in 1661 Harrington "disavowed any practical political purpose to his Rota activities in 1659." It should not be misunderstood, however, as a disinterested debate club at least as far as Harrington himself. He did want to see his ideas enter into the parliamentary government.

=== The club in politics ===
The Rump Parliament was distrustful of the Rota Club and the ideals they stood for. Most of the Rump politicians disliked the voting by ballot idea, and they were even more loath to the rotation of political positions espoused by a Rota or Oceana style government. They disliked the principle of Oceana by which all members would be turned out of their seats in government within nine years. There was in this period much contention, then, over the politics of England without a monarch.

The Stuart monarchs also knew of the Rota Club. Henry Hyde, a loyalist to the crown, had informants who took the club seriously and used the testimony of these spies against Harrington and his club in 1661. In 1660, with restoration of Charles II, the political establishment began to voice its opposition to the Rota Club.

=== Politics in print ===
What differentiated the Rota Club from other debate societies at this time was that they published their political viewpoints in the last months of the interregnum. They are the only debate society known to have done this, and presented this information in THE ROTA: OR, A Model of a free State, or equal Commonwealth.

== Topics of discussion ==
The topics of discussion of the Rota Club conformed more or less to the interests of its founder James Harrington. Namely these interests were the lessons of Roman and ancient history, and modern statecraft. Pepys diary records that on 14 January 1660 he heard a "good argument against Mr. Harrington's assertion that overbalance of propriety was the foundation of government". On January 17 the discussion was on "the state of the Roman Government [as] not a settled government [or]... a steady government." The final discussion recorded of the Rota club was "whether learned or unlearned subjects are the best." These discussions conform to the general interests of James Harrington, but more than that represent discussions relating directly to politics. More specifically they relate to the politics of the Rota Club, being discussions to do with the proper functioning of a republic.

In THE ROTA: OR, A Model of a free State, or equal Commonwealth the first declaration of the Rota Club is of their desired topic for any given debate.

RESOLVED, that the proposer be desired, and is hereby desired to bring in a model of a free state, or equal commonwealth, at large, to be farther debated by this society, and that in order thereunto it be first printed.

The topic of any debate then had to conform to the discussion of a republican government, or a discussion that would lead to an understanding of this sort of government. This conforms nicely to the evidence given by other primary sources which corroborate this point.

== Methods and structure ==
=== Structure ===
The Rota Club had a defined organization within its operation. There was a person to take the minutes, Harrington himself, a system of membership, and a Chairman, usually occupied by Cyriack Skinner or Sir William Poulteney. This structure was instituted so that the debate would be orderly, carefully considered, and serious.

The group of participants would be placed around an oval, sometimes called 'Roman,' table with a passage cut into it for the waiter of the coffeehouse to serve his drinks. It appears from accounts that those less important spectators could have been placed around the room, as Pepys seems to have been. This was perhaps a system of replicating equality of the members of the Rota Club, that no one stood at the head of the table.

The benefit of the Rota Club printing the proper form of its operation is that we have an itemization of their organization and methodologies. In THE ROTA: OR, A Model of a free State, or equal Commonwealth we can see a basic framework discussed.

RESOLVED, that the proposer be desired, and is hereby desired to bring in a model of a free state, or equal commonwealth, at large, to be farther debated by this society, and that in order thereunto it be first printed.

RESOLVED, that the model being proposed in print, shall be first read, and then debated by clauses.

RESOLVED, that a clause being read over night, the debate thereupon begin not at the sooner till the next evening.

RESOLVED, that such as will debate, be desired to bring in their queries upon, or objections against the clause in debate, if they think fit, in writing.

RESOLVED, that debate being sufficiently had upon a clause, the question be put by the ballotting-box, not any way to determine of, or meddle with the government of these nations, but to discover the judgment of this society, upon the form of popular government, in abstract, or secundum artem.

The first resolution of the Rota was that at any given debate a topic must be presented in printed form so that all could read it. From Samuel Pepys' diary we can see that these debates need not end at the first reading, but rather could and did spill over into other nights of debate. From the same journal entry we can also see evidence of the other resolutions being that the initially proposed topic was produced, given a full days time to consider, upon which Pepys says he "heard [a] very good discourse; it was in answer to Mr. Harrington's answer." Further Pepys states that "it was carried by ballot that it was a steady government; though, it is true by the voices, it had been carried before that it was an unsteady government. So tomorrow it is to be proved by the opponents..." The cycle of the Rota Club then was sober consideration followed by debate and lastly voting.

=== Voting ===
Voting was extremely important for the Rota Club. It used two forms of voting, the first being orderly vocal voting, and the second being a closed ballot. These existed side by side, vocal voting always followed by a ballot. As seen in Pepys diary this system was in place to discover discrepancies with what persons would vote for vocally and then secretly. This was used to discover the "true" feelings of those in attendance, which was not always to the benefit of the topics proposer as Harrington himself was voted down in the ballot after having won the vocal vote. This was the system espoused by the Oceana however and the successful application of Harrington's ideas required that this important aspect of his utopian government feature heavily in his Rota Club to publicize it.

=== The public sphere ===
The public sphere, as proposed by Jürgen Habermas, operated in the Coffeehouse, a venue of urbanity and commercialism for men to debate matters of interest logically and rationally. To quote Habermas, the coffeehouse was “a forum in which the private people, come together to form a public, readied themselves to compel public authority to legitimate itself before public opinion.” The Rota Club and its place in the coffeehouse as well as its logical and rational debates fit into this ideology well. Furthermore, Harrington’s motivations to get his work into the public (the public opinion), and from there into parliament (the public authority) complies with Habermas's ideas on public authority having to legitimate itself to public opinion. While Habermas focuses on the eighteenth century, the Rota Club conforms to the criteria of the public sphere.

=== End ===
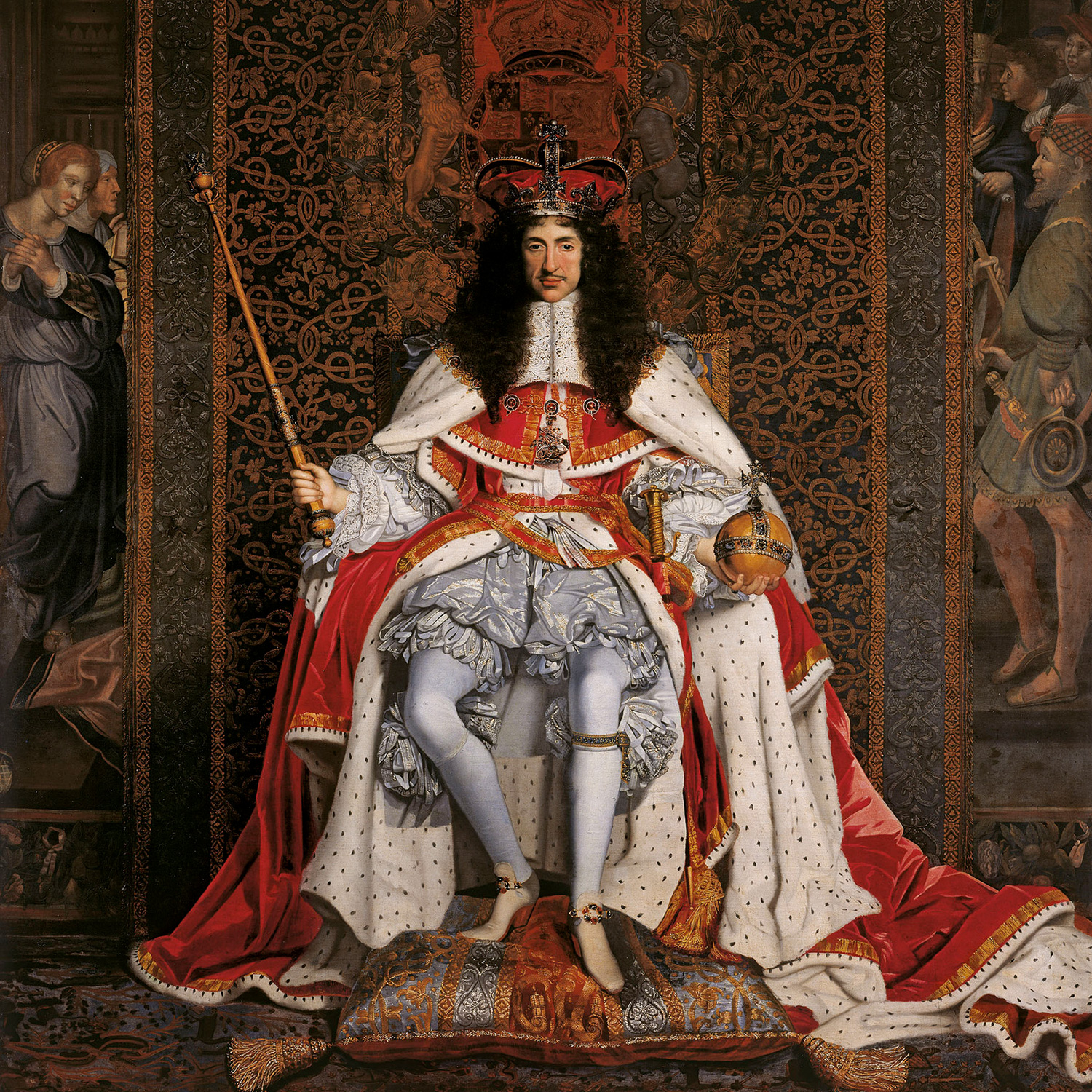
Charles in his coronation robes

The end of the Rota Club is tied to the end of the Rump Parliaments in England. As a debate club centered on a Commonwealth and republican ideals it experienced most of its success when the power of government was solidly with the parliament. However, with the imminent arrival of King Charles II of England the attendance at the Rota Club's meetings fell off dramatically. In his Brief Lives, John Aubrey records that when General George Monck entered London in early February 1660 the debate on models of republicanism and Commonwealth ceased. Samuel Pepys recorded in his diary on 20 February 1660 that "after a small debate upon the Question whether learned or unlearned subjects are the best, the club broke off very poorly, and I do not think they will meet any more." The Rota Club, while not declaring itself a politically charged society, did rely on a political atmosphere conducive to its philosophies. With the fall of the Rump Parliament on 16 March and the coming of Charles II's monarchy this club no longer held the imagination of those who had so briefly attended the republican club, there just was not an opportunity to see the republican ideas expressed in a monarchy.

=== Legacy ===
Coffee, political conversation and debate went hand in hand with radicalism and dangerous social strife in the mind of the monarchy following the period of the Rota Club in England. What differentiated the ‘loyal English man’ from the radical revolutionary was their choice of drink. Coffee was viewed as disloyal to the king, English beer and ale being the true mark of loyalists. This has been suggested to be a result of societies like the well-known Rota Club's association with the coffee houses, such clubs being seen as dissenters and possible enemies of the monarchy after the restoration of Charles II. While not solely caused by the Rota Club, it was one of the institutions that fed such talk.

The secret ballot voting specifically seems to also have made its way into such institutions as the Royal Society, Bank of England, and other clubs following this period. Furthermore, some members of the Royal Society had frequented the Rota Club and likely took the ideologies they learned there with them. More generally, the republican views tempered by the Rota debates and remembered by those who participated may have helped form the United States Constitution. Overall, however, the significance of the Rota Club is that the members who learned and trained in republican ideology there went into the world, taking these philosophies with them.
