= Upton, Northamptonshire =

Civil parish in Northamptonshire, England

Coordinates: 52.235159°N 0.951905°W

Upton
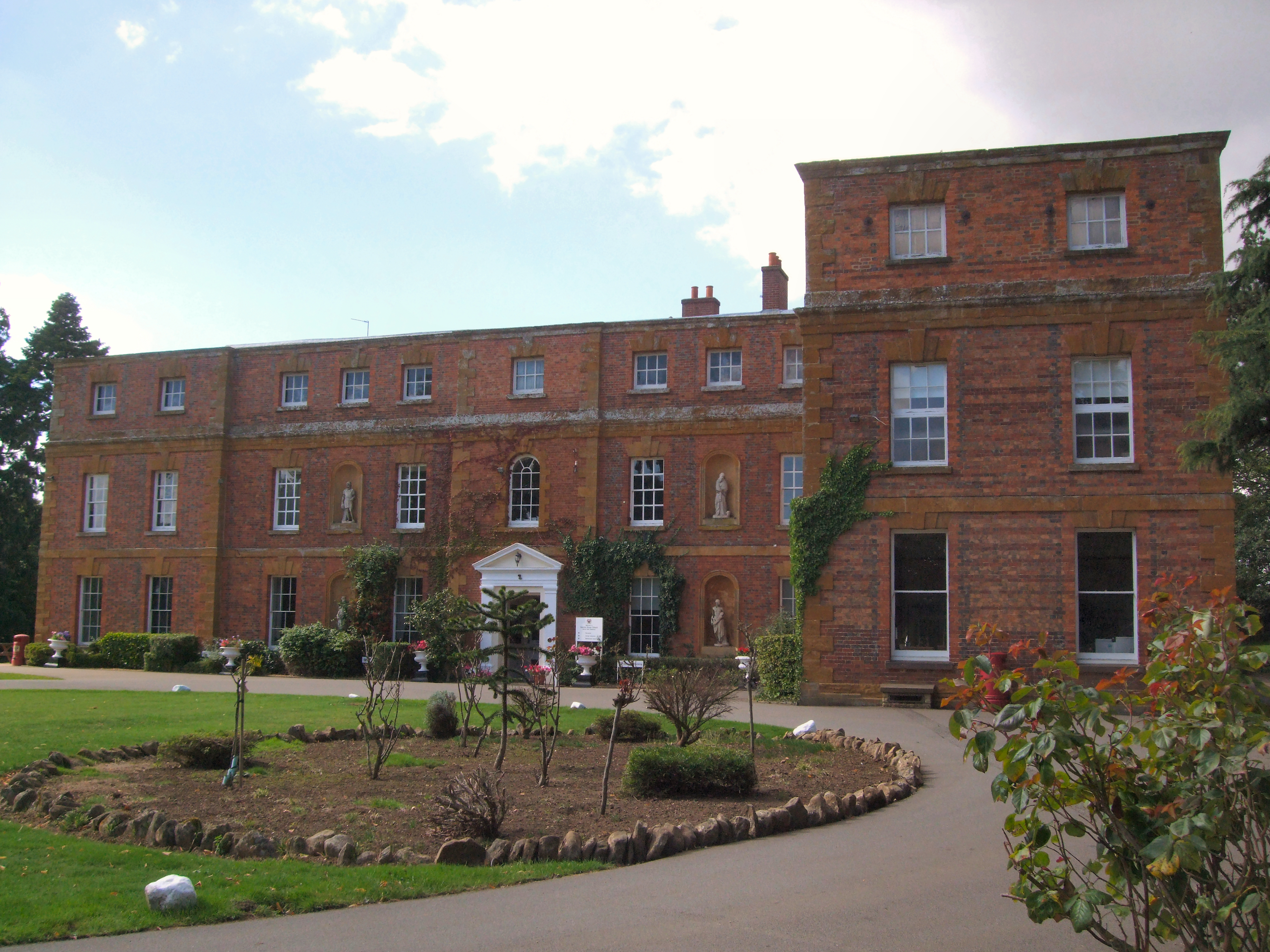
- Upton Hall

- Location within Northamptonshire
- Population: 10,035 (2021 census); 1,720 (2011 census); 590 (2001 census)
- OS grid reference: SP719601
  - London: 68 miles (109 km)
- Unitary authority: West Northamptonshire
- Ceremonial county: Northamptonshire
- Region: East Midlands
- Country: England
- Sovereign state: United Kingdom
- Post town: Northampton
- Postcode district: NN5
- Dialling code: 01604
- Police: Northamptonshire
- Fire: Northamptonshire
- Ambulance: East Midlands
- UK Parliament: Northampton South

Upton is a civil parish north-east of Kislingbury and south-west of Dallington, in Northamptonshire, England about 3.5 miles (6 km) west of Northampton town centre along the A4500 road. Formerly a scattered hamlet, it is now part of the town. The area west of Northampton is now a major area of expansion of the town and named Upton after the parish.

== Demographics ==
The 2021 census shows that the parish's population was 10,035 people.

== Governance ==
Although in the medieval period Upton formed a distinct manor, ecclesiastically its church of St Michael was a chapel of ease to the church of St Peter in Northampton and the village therefore formed a detached part of St Peter's parish. Upton did, however, maintain its own poor under the poor laws. It lay within the hundred of Nobottle Grove.

The date of Upton becoming a separate civil parish is unknown. It may have been as late as 1866, when the Poor Law Amendment Act automatically converted chapelries which maintained their own poor into separate civil parishes. However, Lewis's Dictionary of 1849 has it as a parish rather than a chapelry.

Ecclesiastically Upton remained part of St Peter's parish until 1966, when St Michael's finally became a parish church. However, it closed for worship in 1980 and was declared redundant the following year, its parish being combined with that of St Luke's, Duston to form the Duston and Upton Team Ministry.

Upton has had a parish council since 1894 when parish councils were introduced. From 1894 to 1974 it lay within Northampton Rural District. From 1974 to 2021 it was one of the few parishes within the bounds of Northampton Borough, and lay within the Upton Ward of Northampton Borough Council and the Sixfields Division of Northamptonshire County Council. From 2021 it has lain within West Northamptonshire, and is now part of the Upton Ward of West Northamptonshire Council.

== History ==
The name 'Upton' means 'Higher farm/settlement'. The village is both on a hill and is higher up the River Nene than Northampton.

=== Upton Hall ===
James Harington, the author of The Commonwealth of Oceana, which found little favour with Oliver Cromwell, was born in Upton Hall in 1611. He wrote the book in the nearby village of Milton Malsor. Harington's mother was Jane Samwell (or Samuell) of Upton, daughter of Sir William Samwell. The Samwells bought the hall in 1600 from the Knightley family of Fawsley who had owned the hall since 1419. Most of the hall's appearance today is due to the Samwells. However, a late medieval roof remains above the hall ceiling. The front of the hall is 17th century. Sir Thomas Samwell's initials are on a rainwater head dated 1748. The Hall is a Grade I listed building. There are interesting family pictures and fine plasterwork dating from 1737. Also notable is the carved roof with late medieval tombers and the ballroom. The building is not open to the public except occasionally when Northampton Borough Council organise a heritage open day, usually a weekend in September.

A girls boarding and day school was started in Upton Hall by the Misses Teape in 1946 and given the name Upton Hall School. In 1964 a visitor arrived at Upton Hall School with a copy of Pevsner's Buildings of England in hand asking if he could see inside the Hall and particularly to see the roof space. This visitor was Viscount Althorp, later to become the 8th Earl Spencer, who of course lived at the beautiful Althorp about 6 miles from Upton Hall.

Quinton House School, an independent school for 2-18 year olds, now occupies Upton Hall buildings including a modern sports hall.

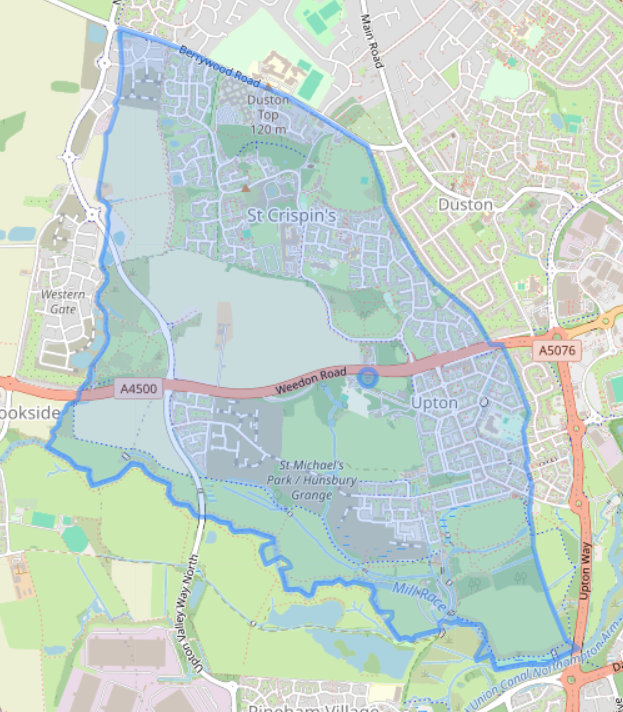
Ancient parish boundaries of Upton (the blue circle marks the location of St Michael's church).

=== St Michael's Church ===
The church is adjacent to the school and alongside the busy A45 road and is Norman, and Norman windows survive. The tower is 14th century. There is a monument to Sir Richard Knightley (d.1537) and a memorial tablet to Thomas Samwell Watson Samwell (d.1835).

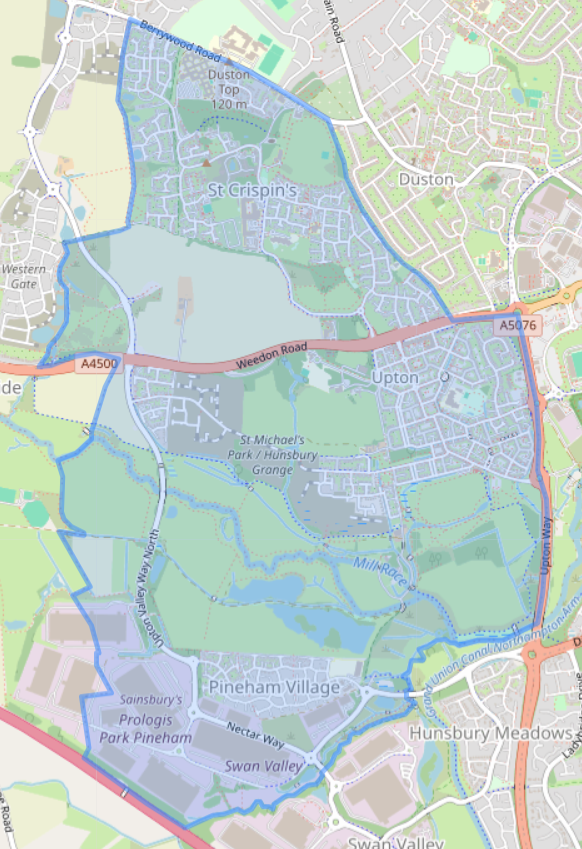
Modern parish boundaries of Upton

=== Saxon building ===
West of the church are the remains of a 6th or 7th century Saxon timber building, excavated in 1965.
