= Volkskörper =

German term for the "ethnic body politic"

The Volkskörper, literally translated as either "national body" or "body national", was the "ethnic body politic" in German population science beginning in the second half of the 19th century. It was increasingly defined in terms of racial biology and was incorporated into Nazi racial theories. After 1945 the term was largely used synonymously with population in anthropology and geography (similarly to ethnicity or nation-state). In political parlance, however, the Volkskörper served as a metaphor for an organic and biological understanding of the unity between the Volk and the Volksgemeinschaft, its broader society. In German politics during the 19th and 20th centuries, it was used especially in antisemitic and racial hygiene texts to semantically differentiate the Volk, conceived as a biological and racial unit, from so-called "parasites", "pests" and "diseases". In this naturalistic sense "excretion" was construed in such a way as to define elements of the population as disease-causing and therefore needing to be expelled. The metaphor of the body national was therefore closely related to the Nazi regime's racial system and justified the enactment of policies like Aktion T4.

== Körper metaphors in political language ==
The metaphorical transfer of medical terms and language to the areas of society, politics and history can be traced back to antiquity. Plato, for example, understands the human body in the Republic and Timaeus as an image of the state. Aristotle uses the comparison of organisms to explain the structure of society. Livy relates the body in connection with the secession of the plebeians in 494 BC with the fable "The Belly and the Members" in which the rebellious limbs refuse to serve the stomach and are therefore no longer nourished.

A circulation metaphor emerged from the medical blood circulation model developed by William Harvey in the 16th century, which had a great impact in political texts. Thomas Hobbes already took up the circulation model in Leviathan, while the circulation metaphor experienced a boom in the 18th century. Body metaphors gained special importance in the French Revolution. Representatives of the Third Estate especially took up metaphors of the blood circulation and medical vitalism in order to formulate new ideals of social equality.

== Folk body in the 19th century ==
In this form, the concept of the people's body also appeared in the German language. The Deutsches Wörterbuch, for example, traces the term back to the History of the French Revolution by Friedrich Christoph Dahlmann, who wrote of the "people as a living organism" which is "a healthy state principle ... at the same time refreshes the blood circulation in the entire national body".

=== Reference term of antisemitism ===
Under the influence of evolutionary theory and social Darwinism, the metaphor of the folk body became increasingly naturalistic in the last third of the 19th century. This was intended to express an unconditional dependence of various social groups on one another. Conversely, authors and publicists used the term to pathologize social groups they particularly rejected. The term was initially used primarily by antisemites to justify the need to "exclude" Jews from society as allegedly "harmful elements".

The court preacher Adolf Stöcker put it as follows:

"Modern Judaism is a foreign blood drop in our national body; it is a perishable, only perishable power."

— Adolf Stöcker, Christian Social. Speeches and essays. 2nd Edition. Berlin 1890, p. 399.

In this way, the "German people", but also the "Jewish people", were declared to be an organic whole and the existence of one people in the other was impossible.

=== Body national in population sciences ===
The body national was not only a political metaphor, but also found its way into scientific linguistic usage. Especially in disciplines such as population statistics, population theory and genealogy, which, so to speak, formed the hard core of the diffuse discipline "population science", the question of the economic "human value" has been raised since the middle of the 19th century. In this context, the "people's body" was not necessarily linked to the selectionist aspects of Social Darwinism. Rudolf Goldscheid's powerful concept of "human economy", for example, defined the human being as "biological capital" and explicitly cited reproductive hygiene "as a means of enhancing the quality of the national body". In addition, however, he counted above all a "productivity policy" such as child protection, maternity protection, youth welfare, maternity insurance, etc. and rejected selectionist measures in the sense of selective breeding.

Towards the end of the 19th century and especially after the First World War, however, the population policy approach that advocated such negative measures became radicalized. Racial hygiene also took up the concept of the people's body. Wilhelm Schallmayer, for example, defined "hereditary hygiene" as a science that had to administer "the hereditary constitution of the national body". He argued:

When looking at politics from a scientific perspective, its ultimate goal appears to be the creation of the conditions for the most permanent possible preservation and possibly also a prosperous growth of the national body. The competitiveness of peoples and states depends on the one hand on their inherited qualities, on the other hand on the disposal of those means of power which culture provides, which can only be transferred from generation to generation through tradition. From this it obviously follows that not only the latter, the cultural goods, but also the generative human hereditary values are the subject of politics, at least of a prudent and far-sighted policy.

— Wilhelm Schallmayer, Contributions to a National Biology (1905)

== Body national after the First World War ==
The First World War and its immediate consequences represented a turning point in the use of organic metaphors. While the great power of the German "people's body" had been described previously, the national state during the Weimar Republic was mainly interpreted through the categories of illness and recovery. Politicians like Theodor Lewald called for compulsory sport to be introduced as a replacement for the lost conscription in order to strengthen the body national. The statistician Friedrich Burgdörfer summarized in 1932 in his book People Without Youth the widespread concern about the "progressive aging and senescence of our body politic" in the dramatic words: "The German people driving biologically into the abyss". The Transylvanian Johann Bredt plagiarised the work with his book title People's State Research, published in 1930 in Breslau.

=== Body national in Nazism ===
In Nazi Germany, these different lines of development were combined. The "people's body" was often synonymous with the "racial" structure of a "people". In Mein Kampf, Adolf Hitler used the concept of the body national both in antisemitic and in racial hygiene and anti-Marxist contexts as a reference for alleged illness and poisoning. The law for the prevention of genetically ill offspring was justified with the "will of the government" to "purify the national body and gradually eradicate the pathological genetic makeup".

Population scientists like Friedrich Burgdörfer understood the people's bodies during Nazism explicitly in a völkisch sense, not just as "population":

This "people" is not – like the "population" – an amorphous sum of individuals, but an organic structure, an organism. We rightly and deliberately speak of a people's body, a people's body, the cells of which are not the individual individuals in their isolation, but the families who belong to the same people in terms of blood and race as well as language, customs and culture. ... Thus the people does not just consist of the sum of the current living comrades, but everything that was, is and will be of the same blood belongs to it.

— Friedrich Burgdörfer, Demographic Statistics and Population Policy (1940)

Overall, the concept of the body national became an omnipresent metaphor during the Nazi era to describe the German population as a biological-racial unit that protects against various types of threats, or heals and cleanses those from various diseases, pests and parasites would. Thorsten Hallig, Julia Schäfer and Jörg Vögele stated that "the scientific foundations or lines of tradition and the intellectual climate within which the eugenic extermination policy of the National Socialists ... could take place were already in the political debates about the degeneration of the 'People's body' of the Weimar Republic".

Hans Asperger used the term when deporting unwanted children to the Am Spiegelgrund killing center in Vienna (after the Anschluss):

In the new Germany, we doctors have taken on a multitude of new duties in addition to our old ones. Just as the doctor often has to make painful incisions when treating the individual, we have to make incisions in the body of the people out of great responsibility. We must ensure that what is sick and what would pass this disease on to future generations, to the disaster of the individual and the people, is prevented from passing on the sick genetic make-up.

— Hans Asperger, from Herwig Czech: National Socialism and "race hygiene" in Nazi-era Vienna. In: Molecular Autism, Volume 9, 2018, pp. 29 ff.

The relationship of German population science to the racial foundation of "national body research" under National Socialism is controversial. The sociologist Carsten Klingemann, for example, has argued that the population scientists, who are mostly trained in sociological thinking, have always understood the "breakdown of the national body" in terms of social statistics and are less interested in the supposed homogeneity of a race than in what is called the stratification of the population in the sociological sense would. The historian Axel Flügel, on the other hand, has criticized such an overly "formal view" that overlooks conceptual breaks in the use of the respective vocabulary. Using the example of Gunther Ipsen's "folk history", he points out that this form of population research "has fallen behind the differentiated state of population science that weighs a large number of regional, social and cultural factors".

== Semantic restructuring after 1945 ==
It was first and foremost Gunther Ipsen who continued to use the concept of the people's body after 1945, albeit rebuilding it semantically. In 1933, he defined the body national still as "the whole of the organic constitution of a particular racial existence as the origin of the generic process." This, in turn, is "the process by which the genus the duration of their kind guaranteed by blows by the sex, the limitations of individual existence". In his article "Volkskörper" for the Große Brockhaus (16th edition) from 1957 he defined it as "the totality of a population, broken down according to gender, year, age group, marital status, occupation, etc." In 1960 he equated "national body" with "population" as a "form of existence of a crowd connected by commercium and connubium. Here commercium means the handling of the services (that is, in the broadest sense, the circle of business people); connubium the unification of the genus in the total of marriage circles, marriages, families, relatives and gender sequence."

The concept of the body national largely disappeared from political language after 1945. In a radio address in 1951, Thomas Dehler wanted to describe the German Trade Union Confederation as a "malignant tumor in the German national body", but after the manuscript became known and the DGB intervened with Chancellor Konrad Adenauer, he decided not to use this formulation. In the works by Gunther Ipsen, but also those on German population history by Gerhard Mack Roth, however, there remained the concept of the body politic until the 1970s. Wolfgang Koellmann for example, consciously tied in with his teacher Ipsen when he used "people's body" as an analytical term in his population history of 1972.
