= Rachel Hammersley =

Professor of Intellectual History at Newcastle University

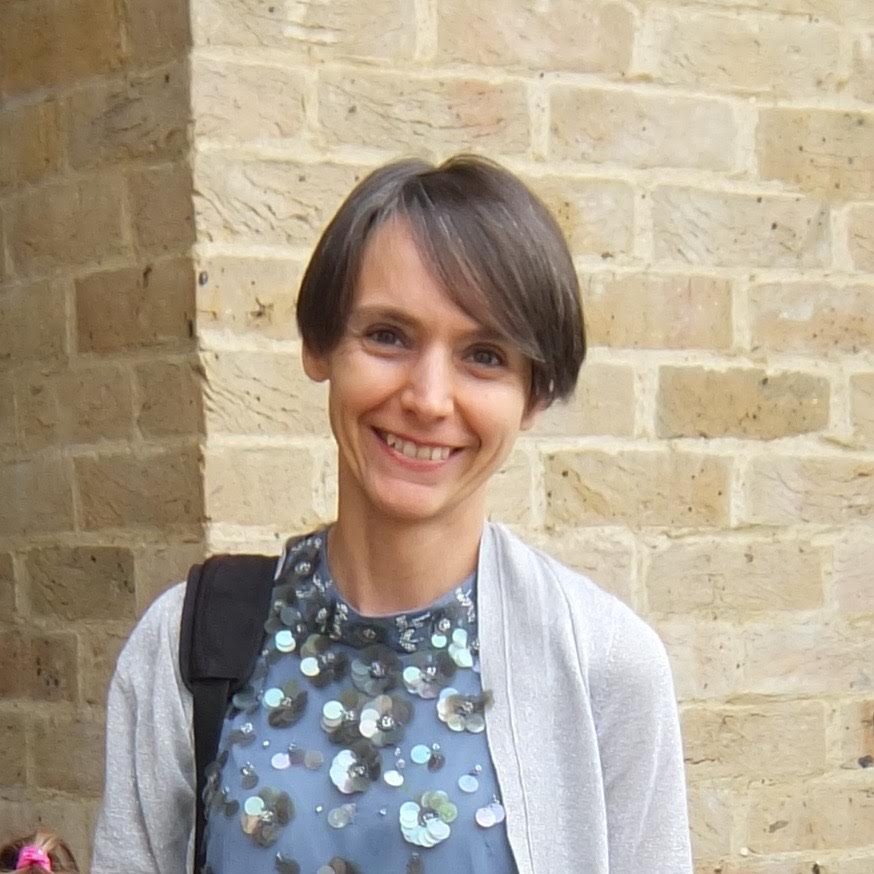
- Occupation: Historian

Rachel Hammersley is Professor of Intellectual History at Newcastle University.

She is a Fellow of the Royal Historical Society and an editorial board member for the journals History of European Ideas and Global Intellectual History.

From 2001 to 2004, Hammersley was a lecturer, and then Leverhulme Research Fellow, at Sussex University.

In June 2018, she was a member of the expert panel on BBC Radio 4's In Our Time on Montesquieu. The BBC radio 4 series Making History has featured Hammersley as an expert in 2010 on late eighteenth century French plans to invade Britain, in 2015, for the same programme, she was asked to discuss the Jacobite siege of Carlisle and the French Resistance, and in 2017 she contributed to a feature on the Northumbrian Enlightenment.

Her early research was concerned with the influence of English republican ideas on the French Revolution, focusing in particular on the employment of those ideas by some members of the Cordeliers Club. She has also investigated the two-way flow of ideas across the Channel in the eighteenth century. More recently she has produced a biography of James Harrington, an English republican political theorist, and a text on Republicanism.

== Selected publications ==
- Hammersley, Rachel (2020) Republicanism: An introduction, Cambridge, Polity Press. ISBN 9781509513413
- Hammersley, Rachel (2019) James Harrington: An intellectual biography, Oxford University Press, ISBN 9780198809852
- Hammersley, Rachel (2016), The English Republican tradition and eighteenth-century France : between the ancients and the moderns, Studies in early modern European history, Manchester University Press, ISBN 978-1784991371
- Hammersley, Rachel (2015), Revolutionary Moments, Textual Moments in the History of Political Thought, Bloomsbury Publishing, ISBN 9781472517234
- Hammersley, Rachel (2011), French revolutionaries and English republicans : the Cordeliers Club, 1790-1794, Royal Historical Society studies in history., New series., Woodbridge, ISBN 978-1843836469
