= Gerania (book) =

Gerania; a New Discovery of a Little Sort of People, anciently discoursed of, called Pygmies is a 1675 novel by Joshua Barnes. The work falls into the utopian socialism genre. It is set in India, with a race of pygmies living within a communitarian utopia, with Homer as their "lawgiver". In contrast with the policy of closure and occlusion common to the movement, Barnes's pygmy utopia is open and congenial, affable to outsiders.
