= The Isle of Pines =

1668 book by Henry Neville

The Isle of Pines is a book by Henry Neville published in 1668. It has been cited as the first robinsonade before Defoe's work. It is also one of the early Utopian narratives, along with Thomas More's Utopia and Francis Bacon's New Atlantis. An example of arcadian fiction, the book presents its story through an epistolary frame: a "Letter to a friend in London, declaring the truth of his Voyage to the East Indies" written by a fictional Dutchman "Henry Cornelius Van Sloetten," concerning the discovery of an island in the Southern Hemisphere, populated with the descendants of a small group of castaways.

The book explores the story of these castaways — the British George Pine and four female survivors, who are shipwrecked on an idyllic island. Pine finds that the island produces food abundantly with little or no effort, and he soon enjoys a leisurely existence, engaging in open sexual activity with the four women.

Each of the women gives birth to children, who in turn multiply to produce distinct tribes, by which Pine is seen as the patriarch. One of the women, a black slave girl, gives rise to a tribe called the Phills, who increasingly reject the impositions of laws, rules, and Bible readings which are established in an effort to create some form of social order. Eventually one of the Phills tribe rapes a woman from the Trevor tribe, starting a civil war. At this point some Dutch explorers arrive, bringing with them guns which are used to quell the uprising.

The narrative is written from the viewpoint of the Dutch explorers and begins with their arrival and the discovery of a primitive white English-speaking native race. The explorers discover that the islanders are the grandchildren and great-grandchildren of George Pine, and that in just three generations the islanders have lost the technological and industrial advantage of their British origins. They later discover that they possess an axe which lies blunt and is never sharpened. The island itself is so productive of food and shelter that the islanders leave newborn babies exposed to the elements with no harm.

While the island is bounteous and abundant, the narrative raises questions concerning the morality of idleness and dependence on nature. Questions also exist over the status of the piece as utopian literature; elements of utopian writing are apparent, but there are inversions of the usual pattern. Instead of finding an advanced society from which the travellers can learn, the explorers discover a primitive island race in need of rescue from the threat of civil war. Although the island initially seems a paradise of sexual freedom and idyllic plenty, the story is one of dystopia, a devolution into a primitive and crucially unproductive state. The lack of creativity and industry are heightened by the fact that the islanders themselves reproduce in great numbers, leaving in three generations a large population with no scientific or artistic development.

Ibram X. Kendi writes: "The Isle of Pines was one of the first portrayals in British letters of aggressive hypersexual African femininity. Such portrayals served both to exonerate White men of their inhuman rapes and to mask their human attractions to the supposed beast-like women."

Critics like Susan Wiseman have pointed to the possibility of Pines deriving from an anagram of penis, alluding to the sexual preoccupation of the early settlers.

The book also has political overtones. Neville was an anti-Stuart republican, and as a political exile he was clearly conscious of the socio-political concerns of the end of the early modern period. The island narrative is framed by the story of the Dutch explorers who are more organized and better equipped than the English voyage of three generations earlier, and who are needed to rescue a small English colonial nation-state from chaos. It is interesting to note that the book was written at the end of the Second Anglo-Dutch War.

== See also ==
- Robinsonade
