= The Belly and the Members =

Fable by Aesop

The Belly and the Members is one of Aesop's Fables and is numbered 130 in the Perry Index. It has been interpreted in varying political contexts over the centuries.

== The Fable ==
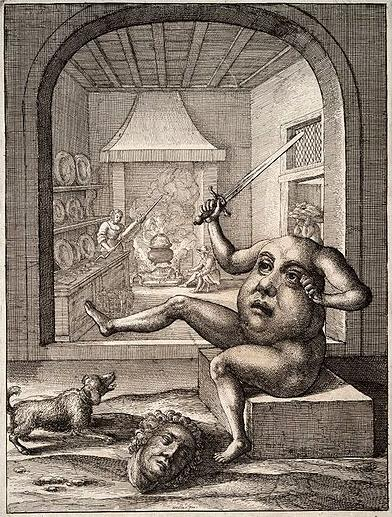
Wenceslas Hollar's illustration from John Ogilby's version of the fables, 1668.

There are several versions of the fable. In early Greek sources it concerns a dispute between the stomach and the feet, or between it and the hands and feet in later Latin versions. These grumble because the stomach gets all of the food, refusing to supply them with nourishment. They see sense when they realise that they are weakening themselves. In Mediaeval versions, the rest of the body becomes so weakened that it dies, and later illustrations almost uniformly portray an enfeebled man expiring on the ground. The present understanding is that the tale's moral supports team effort and recognition of the vital part that all members play in it. In more authoritarian times, however, the fable was taken to affirm direction from the centre.

Research points to early Eastern fables dealing with similar disputes. Most notably there is a fragmentary Egyptian papyrus going back to the 2nd millennium BCE that belongs to the Near Eastern genre of debate poems; in this case the dispute is between the Belly and the Head. It is thus among the first known examples of the body politic metaphor.

== Later applications ==
There is a scriptural use of the concept of co-operation between the various parts of the body by Paul of Tarsus, who was educated in both Hebrew and Hellenic thought. In his first letter to the Corinthians, he shifts away from the fable's political application and gives it the spiritual context of the body of the Church. The metaphor is used to argue that this body represents a multiplicity of talents co-operating together. While there may still be a hierarchy within it, all are to be equally valued for the part they play:

For the body is not one member, but many. If the foot shall say, Because I am not the hand, I am not of the body, is it therefore not of the body? And if the ear shall say, Because I am not the eye, I am not of the body, is it therefore not of the body? If the whole body were an eye, where were the hearing? If the whole were hearing, where were the smelling? But now hath God set the members every one of them in the body, as it hath pleased him. And if they were all one member, where were the body? But now are they many members, yet but one body. And the eye cannot say unto the hand, I have no need of thee: nor again the head to the feet, I have no need of you. Nay, much more those members of the body, which seem to be more feeble, are necessary. And those members of the body which we think to be less honourable, upon these we bestow more abundant honour. (Authorised Version 12.14–23)

The Latin historian Livy leads the way in applying the fable to civil unrest. It is recounted by him in the context of the Aventine secession in 495–93 BCE that a member of the Roman Senate convinced the plebeians, who had left Rome in protest at their mistreatment by the patricians, to return by telling the story. In this politicised form, with the patricians playing the part of the stomach, the fable formed an "exemplary paradigm" for the subsequent Roman philosophy of the body politic. The same fable was later repeated in Plutarch's Life of Coriolanus.

"It once happened," Menenius Agrippa said, "that all the other members of a man mutinied against the stomach, which they accused as the only idle, uncontributing part the whole body, while the rest were put to hardships and the expense of much labour to supply and minister to its appetites. The stomach, however, merely ridiculed the silliness of the members, who appeared not to be aware that the stomach certainly does receive the general nourishment, but only to return it again, and redistribute it amongst the rest. Such is the case," he said, "ye citizens, between you and the senate. The counsels and plans that are there duly digested, convey and secure to all of you your proper benefit and support."

From this source it was taken by William Shakespeare and dramatised in the opening scene of his play Coriolanus.

In French sources the story was similarly applied. The late 12th century version by Marie de France concludes with the feudal reflection that 'no one has honour who shames his lord, nor has the sire unless he honours his men'. Near the end of the 14th century, Eustache Deschamps deplored civil war in a ballade titled Comment le chief et les membres doyvent amer l'un l'autre (How the head and members should love one another). This used the fable to argue that the land is weakened when feudal obligations are transgressed. The head should not oppress those under him and in turn should be obeyed. Three centuries later La Fontaine interpreted the fable in terms of the absolute monarchy of his time. Reversing the order of the ancient historians, he starts with the fable, draws a lengthy moral and only then gives the context in which it was first told. For him the royal power is central to and the sustainer of the state.

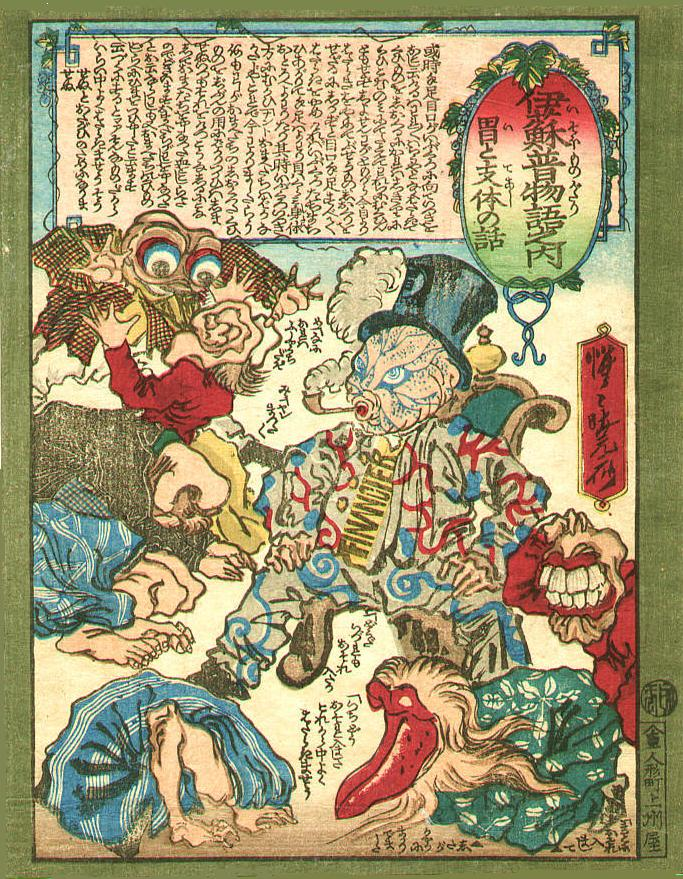
Kawanabe Kyosai's Aesopic satire, The lazy one in the middle, 1870–80

This was so too for John Ogilby in the context of the troubled history of 17th century England. The only member on view in Wenceslas Hollar's illustration of the fable (see above) is the broken head of a statue damaged by the blind, sword-wielding belly. The reference to the Parliamentary beheading of King Charles I and the breakdown of government during the subsequent republican period could not be clearer. At the start of the 19th century, La Fontaine's English translator, John Matthews, was to expand the fable to even greater length. Beginning with the Roman context, he pictures the social strife in more or less contemporary terms and so hints that the fable supports the power of the aristocratic parliament of his day without needing to say so outright.

Ambrose Bierce applied the fable to labour disputes in his Fantastic Fables (1899). When the workers at a shoe factory go on strike for better conditions, in his satirical rewriting, the owner sets it on fire in order to collect the insurance and so leaves them workless. A slightly earlier Japanese woodblock print by Kawanabe Kyosai in his Isoho Monogotari series (1870–80) had also given the fable a commercial application. Titled "The lazy one in the middle", it shows the seated belly smoking a pipe while the disjointed bodily members crawl on the floor about him. His broad tie is labelled 'Financier' in western lettering to drive home the point. In both these cases the argument of the centre as sustainer is turned around. Far from keeping the members alive, the belly's selfish concerns and greedy demands sap them of energy.
