= Quinton House School =

Location
- Upton Hall; Upton; Northampton, Northamptonshire, NN5 4UX; England; 52.234°N 0.950°W

Information
- Type: Private day school
- Motto: Integri in omnibus (Virtuous in all things)
- Established: 1946
- Department for Education URN: 122137 Tables
- Interim Headteacher: Brendan Pavey
- Gender: Mixed
- Age range: 3-18 years
- Enrolment: 387 as of June 2026
- Houses: Harrington, Samwell and Knightley
- Colours: Red & Grey
- Website: http://www.quintonhouseschool.co.uk/

Quinton House School is a co-educational private school for children aged 2 to 18 years located in Upton, Northampton, England. The school is owned and operated by the Blenheim Schools Group.

== History ==
Quinton House School is situated in the Grade I listed building, Upton Hall. The hall dates back to the medieval period with many alterations taking place in the sixteenth and seventeenth century. In 1946 the last private owner, Mr. James, died and the estate passed into the ownership of the Sir Thomas White's trust. A lease was taken out on the buildings by three women surnamed 'Teape' who opened Upton Hall School in 1946. In 1966 the then headmistress, Miss K Madden, renamed it Quinton House School.

1986 saw the ownership of the estate pass to Northampton Borough Council and during this period the main building was re-roofed. The nineties saw many changes at QHS including new sports fields in 1990 which were laid out in the walled garden. In 1991 the school admitted its first sixth formers and in 2017 celebrated '70 years of a school at Upton Hall'.

In 2004 the school was the first acquisition by Cognita Schools and shortly afterwards a major development was planned to upgrade facilities at the school. This culminated in 2008 with the opening of a sports hall and major facility development at the Preparatory and Senior school. Developments at the school during this period included enclosing the open air courtyard, with a bespoke glazed atrium construction. This area is now used as a dining room and assembly for the Junior School.

In January 2026, ownership changed to the Outcomes First Group as part of their Blenheim Schools expansion.

== Academics ==
Quinton House School educates pupils aged 2 through to 18, and is divided into a Nursery, Preparatory, Senior school and the Sixth Form. The school offers GCSEs as programmes of study for pupils, while students in the Sixth Form have the option to study from a range of A-levels.
