= James Harrington (author) =

English political theorist (1611–1677)

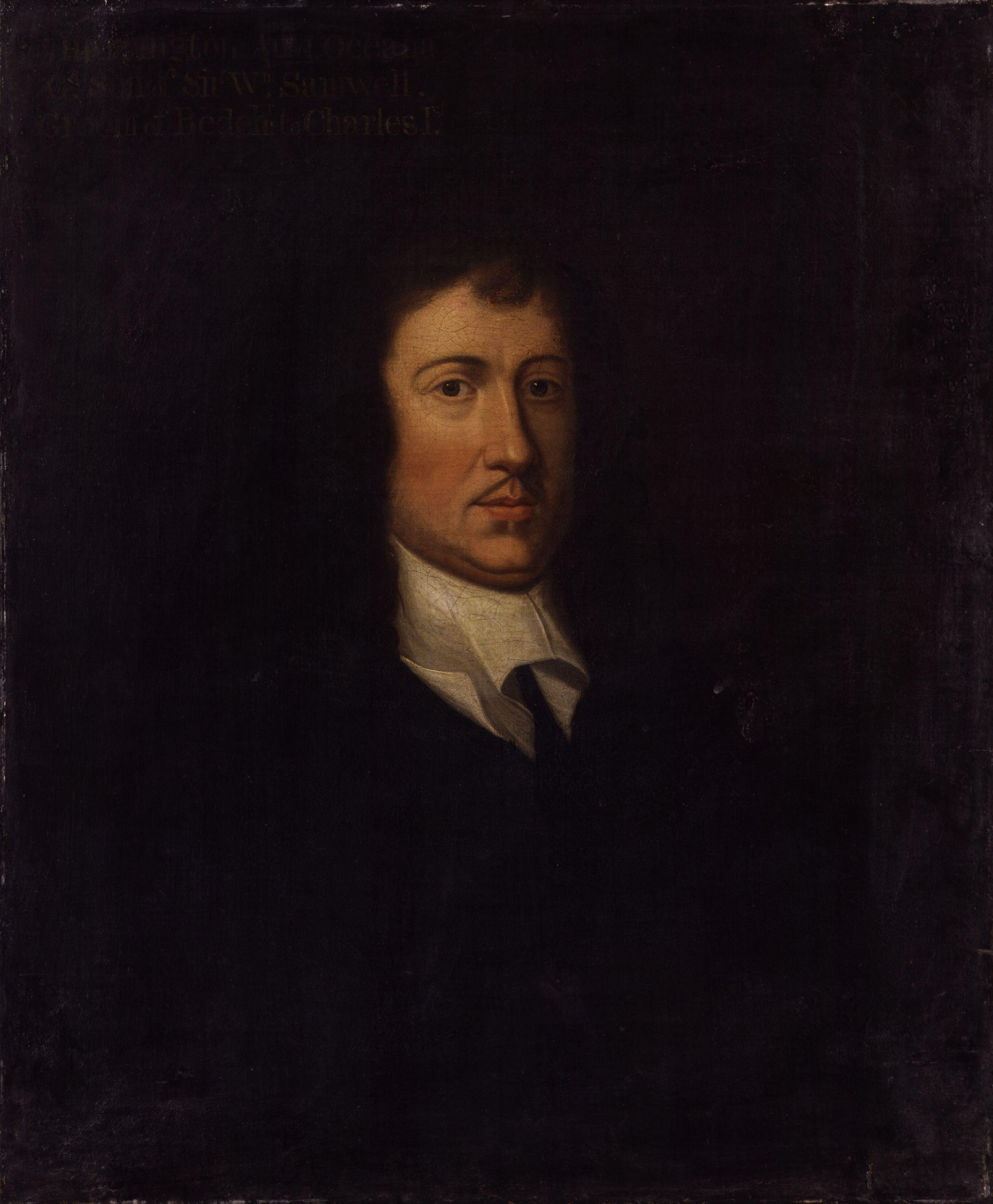
- James Harrington, c. 1658, by Sir Peter Lely
- Born: 3 January 1611; Upton, Northamptonshire, England
- Died: 11 September 1677 (aged 66); Little Ambry, Dean's Yard, Westminster, England
- Resting place: St Margaret's, Westminster
- Education: Trinity College, Oxford
- Writing career
- Language: English
- Period: European wars of religion
- Genre: Utopian fiction
- Subjects: Utopia, classical republicanism
- Notable work: The Commonwealth of Oceana

James Harrington (or Harington; 3 January 1611 – 11 September 1677) was an English political theorist known for his contributions to classical republican thought. He is best known for The Commonwealth of Oceana (1656), an exposition of an ideal republican constitution, based on Aristotle's theories of constitutional stability and revolution, conceived as a model for the Commonwealth of England that had emerged following the execution of Charles I of England in 1649.

The reaction to the book by Oliver Cromwell was unfavourable, and it was initially pulled out of print. The restored monarchy of Charles II had Harrington imprisoned, and he ultimately succumbed to various ailments, possibly contracted while in prison many years earlier.

His vision of an aristocracy with limited powers, of a strong middle class contributing to the stability of a democracy and of a separation of economic and political power has influenced classical republicanism in the United States of America, including the development of the Articles of Confederation, the democratic agrarianism of Thomas Jefferson and the anti-oligarchy policies of Theodore Roosevelt and Woodrow Wilson.

== Early life ==
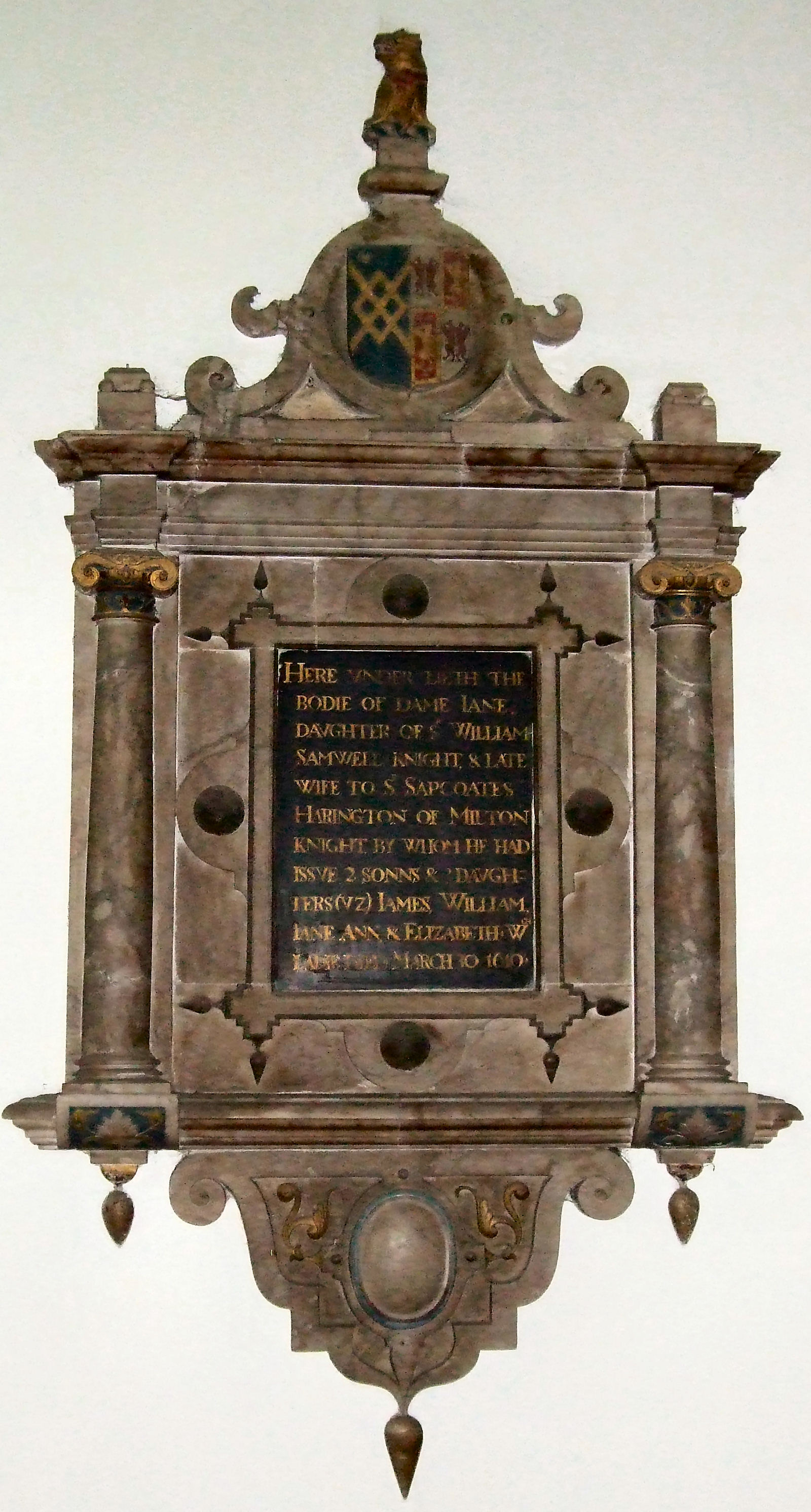
Memorial to Harrington's mother, Dame Jane, in Holy Cross Church, Milton Malsor, Northamptonshire

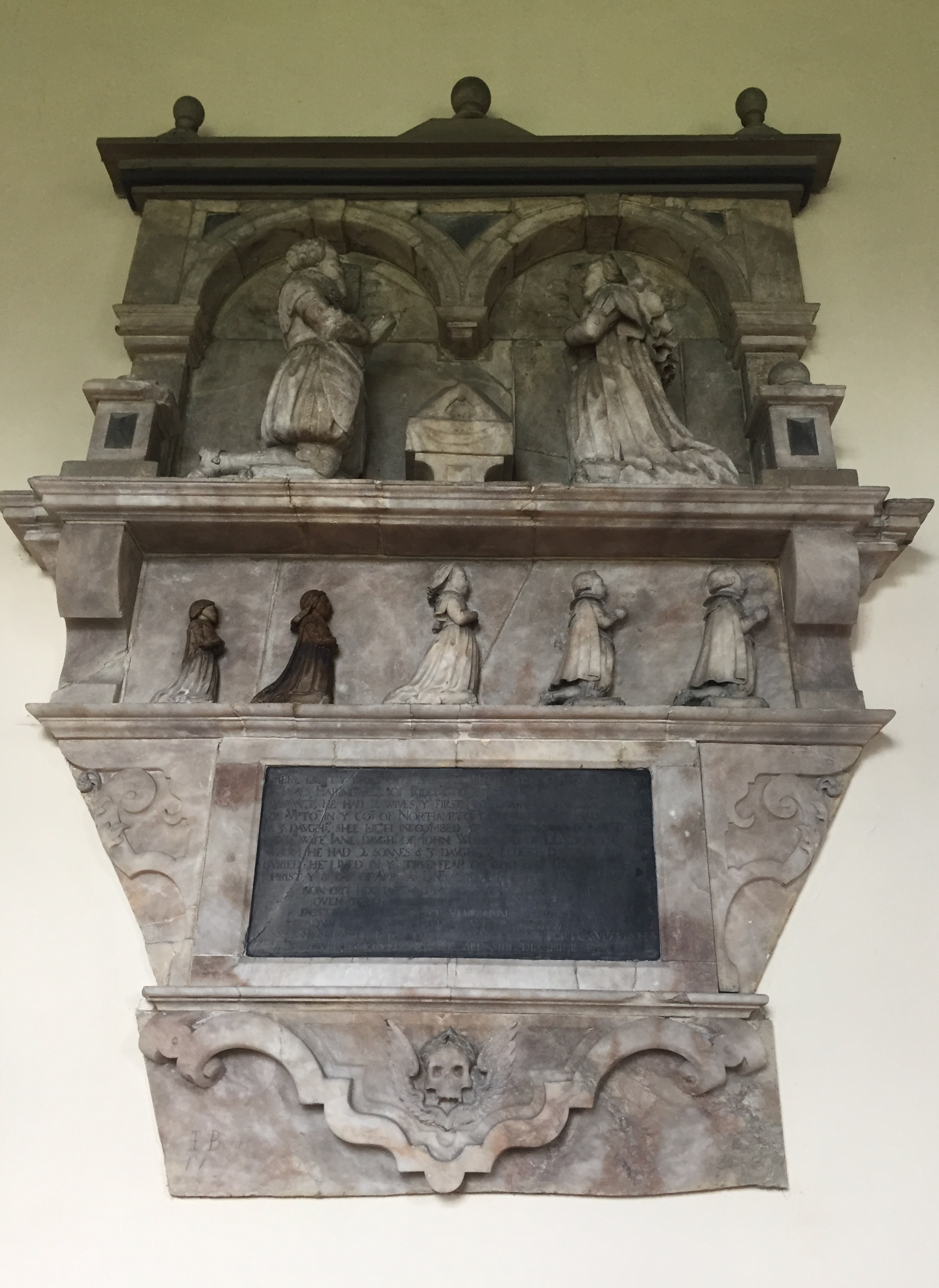
Monument depicting Sir Sapcotes Harrington and his first wife Jane with their five children, in the Church of St Oswald at Rand, Lincolnshire

Harrington was born in 1611 in Upton, Northamptonshire. He was the eldest son of Sir Sapcote(s) Harrington of Rand, Lincolnshire, who died in 1630, and his first wife, Jane Samwell of Upton, daughter of Sir William Samwell. James Harrington was the great-nephew of John Harington, 1st Baron Harington of Exton, who died in 1613. For a period, he resided with his father in the manor house at Milton Malsor, Northamptonshire, which had been bequeathed by Sir William Samwell to his daughter following her marriage. A blue plaque on Milton Malsor Manor commemorates this residence.

Holy Cross Church in Milton Malsor contains a monument on the south wall of the chancel to Harrington's mother, Dame Jane Harrington. According to the memorial, she died on 30 March 1619, when James was 7 or 8 years old. The memorial reads, in modern English but punctuated as in the original:

Here under lies the body of Dame Jane, daughter of Sir William Samwell Knight, & late wife to Sir Sapcotes Harington [sic] of Milton Knight, by whom he had issue 2 sons & 3 daughters, viz James, William, Jane, Anne & Elizabeth. Which Lady died March 30, 1619.

When his father died in June 1630, James commissioned a second monument, which can still be seen in the Church of St Oswald at Rand, Lincolnshire. It depicts Sapcotes and his first wife Jane together with their five children.

== Youth and career ==
Knowledge of Harrington's childhood and early education is thin, though he clearly spent time both in Milton Malsor and at the family manor in Rand. In 1629 he entered Trinity College, Oxford as a gentleman commoner and left two years later with no degree. His eighteenth-century biographer, John Toland, says that while there one of his tutors was the royalist High Churchman William Chillingworth, which may have been the case before the latter left for the Catholic seminary in Douai in 1630. On 27 October 1631 Harrington entered the Middle Temple.

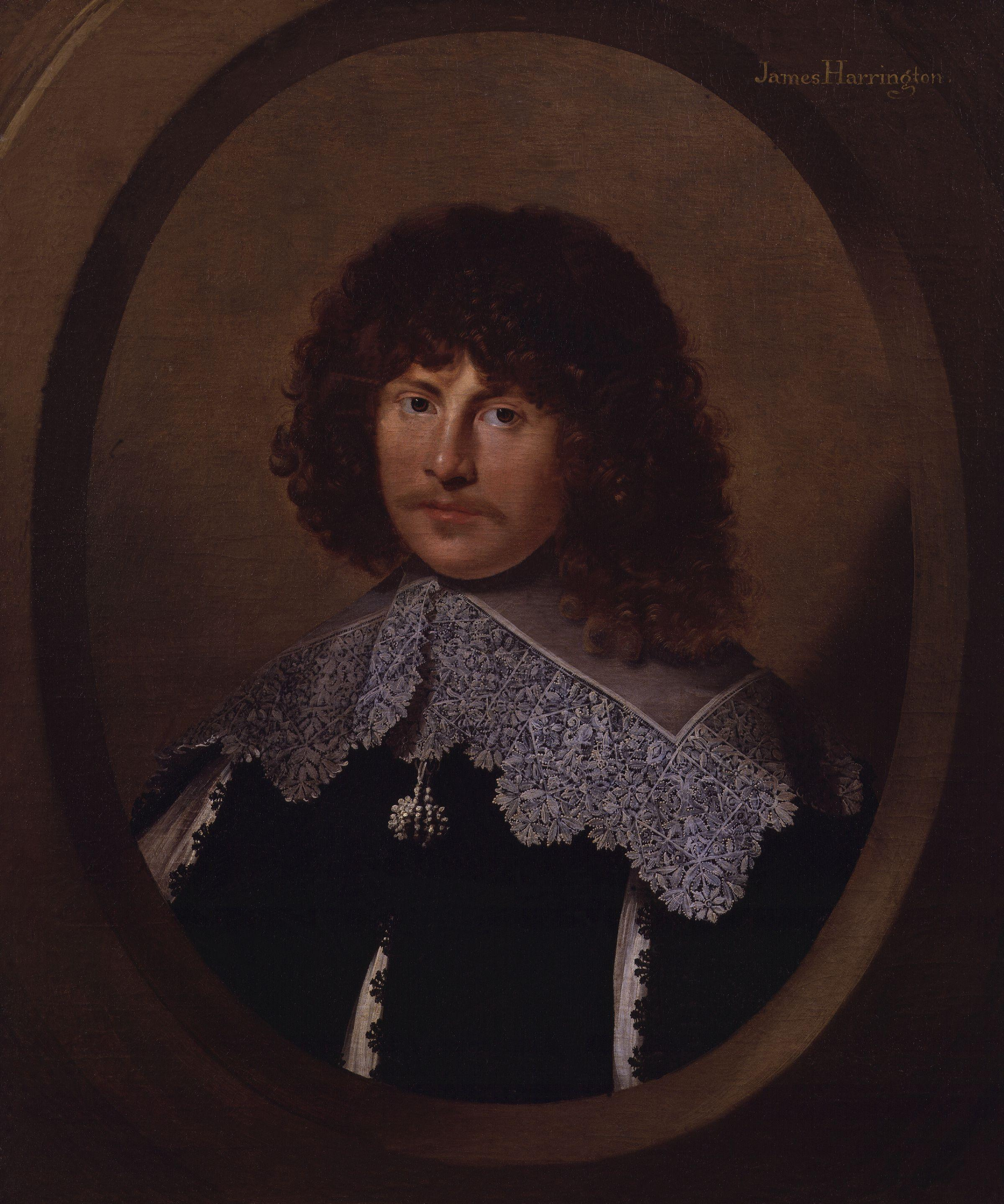
Portrait of James Harrington, oil on canvas, ca. 1635

By this time, Harrington's father had died, and his inheritance helped pay his way through several years of continental travel. There is some suggestion that he enlisted in a Dutch militia regiment (apparently seeing no service), before touring the Netherlands, Denmark, Germany, France, Switzerland and Italy. He was in Geneva with James Zouche in the summer of 1635 and subsequently travelled to Rome. In the light of this, Toland's reference to his visiting the Vatican, where he "refused to kiss the Pope's foot", probably refers to early 1636; meanwhile his visit to Venice helped bolster his knowledge of, and enthusiasm for, the Italian republics. The following decade, including his comings and goings during the Civil Wars, are largely unaccounted for by anything other than unsubstantiated stories, for example that he accompanied Charles I to Scotland in 1639 in connection with the first Bishops' War. In 1641–42 and in 1645 he provided financial assistance to Parliament, providing loans and perhaps also collecting money on behalf of Parliament in Lincolnshire. Yet, around the same time, he was acting as 'agent' for Charles Louis, the Prince Elector Palatine, who was nephew of Charles I and whose brother Prince Rupert led the Royalist forces in the English Civil War. Charles Louis and his mother had declared their support for Parliament in 1642.

Harrington's apparent political loyalty to Parliament did not interfere with a strong personal devotion to the King. Following the capture of Charles I, Harrington accompanied a "commission" of MPs appointed to accompany Charles in the move from Newcastle to Holdenby House (Holmby), after he had been relinquished by the Scots, who had captured him. Harrington's cousin Sir James Harrington was one of the Commissioners, which perhaps explains why the future author of Oceana was one of those who accompanied the commissioners as servants 'to wait upon' the King on the journey. Harrington continued as 'gentleman of the bedchamber' to the King once they reached Holdenby House, and we see him acting in that capacity through to the end of the year at both Carisbrooke Castle and Hurst Castle. However, while at Hurst Castle Harrington got into a discussion with the Governor and various army officers during which he voiced his support for the King's position concerning the Treaty of Newport, resulting in his dismissal. At least two contemporary accounts have Harrington with Charles on the scaffold, but these do not rise above the level of rumour.

== Oceana ==
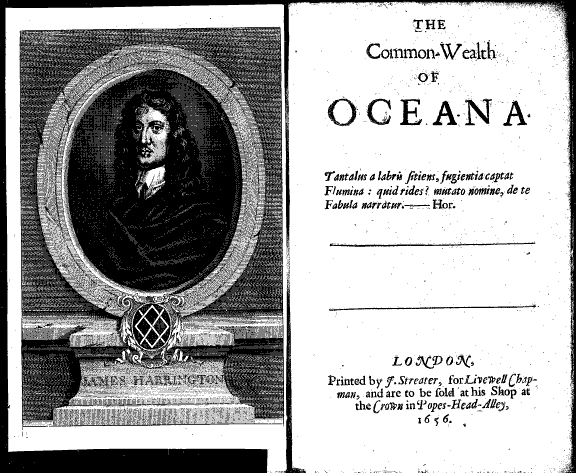
Title page of The Commonwealth of Oceana

After Charles' death, Harrington probably devoted his time to the composition of The Commonwealth of Oceana. By order of England's then Lord Protector Oliver Cromwell, it was seized when passing through the press. Harrington, however, managed to secure the favour of Cromwell's favourite daughter, Elizabeth Claypole. The work was restored to him, and appeared in 1656, newly dedicated to Cromwell. Harrington and others formed a club called the "Rota" in 1659. Together they endeavoured, with little success, to push practically the ideas expressed in Oceana, particularly those bearing on vote by ballot and rotation of magistrates and legislators.

=== Harrington's "cake" metaphor ===
In The Commonwealth of Oceana, Harrington uses a simple analogy, often called his "cake" metaphor, to explain how a fair political systems can balance self interest and the common good at the same time. He wrote:

Two of them have a cake yet undivided, which was given between them. That each of them therefore may have that which is due, 'Divide,' says one unto the other, 'and I will choose; or let me divide, and you shall choose.' If this be but once agreed upon, it is enough; for the divident dividing unequally loses, in regard that the other takes the better half; wherefore she divides equally, and so both have right.

According to J. G. A. Pocock, this simple example shows "the whole mystery of a commonwealth" that a political institutions can be designed so that the pursuit of private interest results in public fairness. Just as a child cutting a cake will divide it equally when another chooses first, the government can distribute power in a way that aligns personal advantage with a collective justice.

=== Editorial history ===
Harrington's manuscripts have vanished; his printed writings consist of Oceana, and papers, pamphlets, aphorisms and treatises, many of which are devoted to its defence. The first two editions of Oceana are known as the "Chapman" and the "Pakeman". Their contents are nearly identical. His Works, including the Pakeman Oceana and a previously unpublished but important manuscript A System of Politics, were first edited with a biography by John Toland in 1700. Toland's edition, with numerous substantial additions by Thomas Birch, appeared first in London in 1737. An edition not including Birch's additions but rather a copy of Henry Neville's Plato Redivivus was published in Dublin in the same year. The 1737 London edition was reprinted in 1747 and 1771. Oceana was reprinted in Henry Morley's Universal Library in 1887; S.B. Liljegren reissued a fastidiously prepared version of the Pakeman edition in 1924.

J. G. A. Pocock was a modern editor of Harrington's work. In 1977, he edited a compilation of many of Harrington tracts, with a lengthy historical introduction. According to Pocock, Harrington's prose was marred by an undisciplined work habit and a conspicuous "lack of sophistication," never attaining the level of "a great literary stylist." For example, as contrasted with Hobbes and Milton, "nowhere" to be found are:

important shades of meaning...conveyed [through] rhythm, emphasis and punctuation; ... He wrote hastily, in a baroque and periodic style in which he more than once lost his way. He suffered from Latinisms...his notions of how to insert quotations, translations and references in his text were at times productive of confusion.

By contrast, Rachel Hammersley has argued that Harrington's literary approach was specifically designed to serve his political purposes, to persuade his readers to act on his ideas.

== Imprisonment and death ==
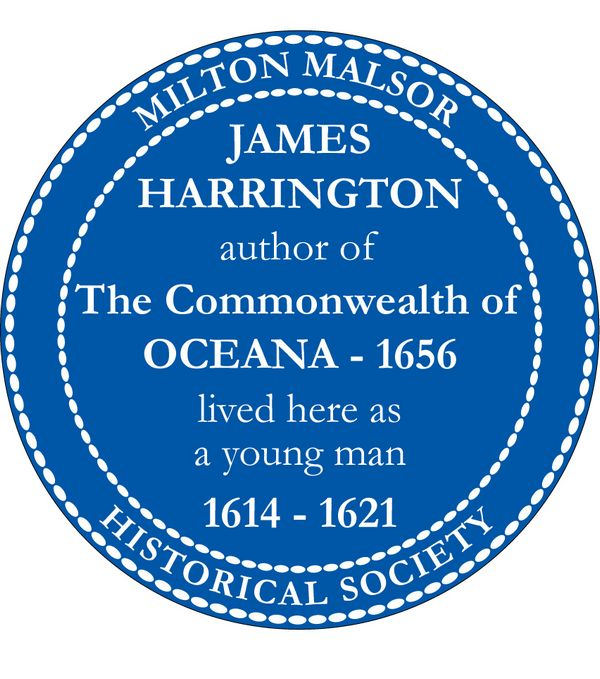
Blue plaque, installed 4 October 2008, marking the Manor House of Milton Malsor where Harrington lived

Following the Stuart Restoration, on 25 November 1661 Harrington was arrested on a charge of conspiring against the government in the "Bow Street" cabal and, without a formal trial, was thrown into the Tower. There, he was "badly treated", and in April 1662 a warrant was issued for him to be held in close custody, which led his sisters into obtaining a writ of habeas corpus. Before it could be executed, however, the authorities rushed him to St Nicholas Island off the coast of Plymouth. His brother and uncle won Harrington's release to the fort at Plymouth by posting a £5000 bond. Thereafter, his general state of health quickly deteriorated, perhaps from his ingestion on medical advice of the addictive drug guaiacum. Harrington's mind appeared to be affected. He suffered "intermittent delusions"; one observer judged him "simply mad." He recovered only slightly, then slipped decidedly downhill. He proceeded to suffer attacks of gout and palsy before falling victim to a paralysing stroke. At some point between 1662 and 1669 he married "a Mrs Dayrell, his 'old sweetheart' ", the daughter of a Buckinghamshire noble.

Harrington died at Little Ambry, Dean's Yard, Westminster on 11 September 1677. He was buried next to Sir Walter Raleigh in St Margaret's, Westminster. There is a slate wall memorial to him at St Michael's Church, Upton.

Harrington has often been confused with his cousin Sir James Harrington, 3rd Baronet of Ridlington, MP, a member of the parliamentary commission which tried Charles I, and twice president of Cromwell's Council of State. This James Harrington was subsequently excluded from the Indemnity and Oblivion Act which pardoned many who had taken up arms against the King during the Civil Wars (1642–46).

== See also ==
- Gawthorpe Hall has a picture of Harrington
