= Henry Neville (writer) =

English politician, author and satirist (1620–1694)

Henry Neville (1620–1694) was an English politician, writer and satirist, best remembered for his tale of shipwreck and dystopia, The Isle of Pines published in 1668.

In 1651, he was elected to the English Council of State, where he played a part in foreign policy. Later, he was in opposition to Oliver Cromwell, against whom he wrote some political pamphlets.

== Life ==
Neville was born in 1620, the second son of Sir Henry Neville (died 1629) of Billingbear House at Waltham St Lawrence in Berkshire, being younger brother of the Royalist commander, Richard Neville. His grandfather, Sir Henry Neville, had served as Ambassador to France.

He was educated at Merton and University Colleges at Oxford, but left without graduating. At an early age, he married Elizabeth, the daughter and heiress of Richard Staverton of Heathley Hall in Warfield which became the couple's country estate. His wife apparently died young.

=== Political activities ===
Henry spent some of the period of the English Civil War travelling on the European continent, returning to England in 1645. In 1647, he anonymously published a satire The Parliament of Ladies. This was a parody of some prominent women associated with the parliamentary side. It was seen as a "libertine parody of the parliamentary publications common at the time." The book was popular and was soon reprinted with various additions.

In April 1649 he was elected to Parliament to fill a vacancy as MP for Abingdon.

By the end of 1651 he was a member of the Council of State, but found himself so hostile to Cromwell that he temporarily retired from active politics.

After Cromwell's death, he returned to Parliament on 30 December 1658, representing Reading.

Starting in the 1650s, he developed a close relationship with the philosopher James Harrington, having become a member of his republican group. Their friendship was so close that Thomas Hobbes suspected Neville's hand in Oceana.

On 19 May 1659, he was given position on the new Council of State. In 1660s, Neville travelled in Italy where he befriended with Ferdinando II de' Medici, Grand Duke of Tuscany and Florentine courtiers.

After the Restoration, he was arrested for treasonable practices in October 1663; he was suspected of involvement in the "Yorkshire rising", also known as the Farnley Wood Plot, and held in the Tower of London (his grandfather was there before him). In May 1664, he was released without punishment, not being regarded as dangerous.

== Works ==
Following his 1663 arrest Neville spent the rest of his life in writing and scholarship.

His pamphlet The Parliament of Ladies (1647) created a lot of controversy; both answers to it and the imitations were published. Soon, there appeared, again anonymously, The Ladies, a Second Time, Assembled in Parliament (1647) which may also be Neville's work.

Three years later, another similar publication appeared, Newes from the New Exchange, or, The Common-Wealth of Ladies (1650); it was published in two editions and also elicited some responses.

In 1656, there appeared two broadsides:

- Nevill versus Strood: the State of the Case.
- A true and perfect relation of the manner and proceeding, held by the sheriffe for the county of Berk: at Redding, upon the 20th. of Aug. last 1656.

They represented his resistance to Cromwell.

Another such tract was Shuffling, Cutting and Dealing in a Game at Picquet. (1659)

In 1668 he published another satirical take on gender and politics, The Isle of Pines. In 1680 he published Plato Redivivus, a political dialogue arguing that the growing number of property owners in England necessitated a wider distribution of political power. He urged Charles II to do what Harrington had urged Cromwell to do: to recognize that his path to both survival and glory lay in a voluntary reduction of his powers, in the manner of that hero of republicans Theopompus of Sparta. He wanted parliament to persuade Charles, by reason or insistence to hand over the functions of government to the House of Commons.

In 1675, Nevile contributed to an edition of Machiavelli's works with a 'letter' fabricated by himself.

== See also ==
- House of Neville
