= The Commonwealth of Oceana =

1656 political book by James Harrington

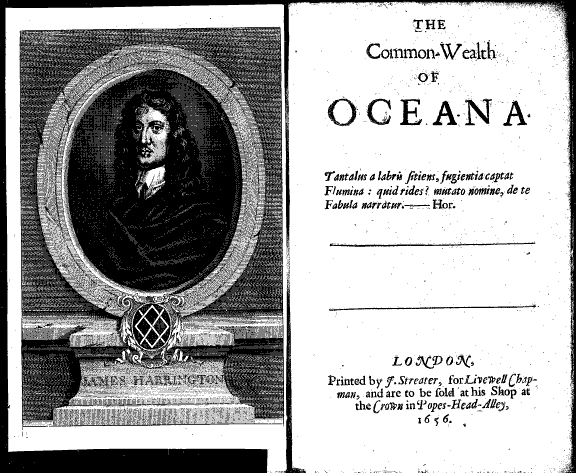
- Title page of The Commonwealth of Oceana
- Author: James Harrington
- Language: English
- Genre: Utopia, Science fiction
- Published: 1656 (Livewell Chapman)

The Commonwealth of Oceana (/oʊˈsiːənə/ oh-SEE-ə-nə), published in 1656, is a seminal work of political philosophy by the English politician and essayist James Harrington (1611–1677). The initial publication of Oceana was met with official censorship from Lord Protector Oliver Cromwell (1599–1658). The publication was eventually made available to the public, and it was dedicated to Cromwell.

The Oceana in the title is an allegorical version of the Commonwealth of England. Cromwell himself is depicted in the book under the alias of the lawgiver Olphaeus Megalator. Harrington presents his ideas about a utopian republic. These include limitations to the amount of land which a single individual can hold, land distribution methods, and term limits for politicians which would prevent them from seeking re-election for a few years following the end of their previous term.

The London printer John Streater published two first editions of the book between September and November 1656, known as the "Pakeman" and the "Chapman". The Chapman edition was advertised in the serial Mercurius Politicus, a "quasi-official" organ of the Commonwealth. In 1659, an abridged version of the book was published in three volumes, under the title The Art of Lawgiving. In 1700 the book was edited by John Toland and included in a collection of Harrington's works. Two 18th-century reprints of the book in Dublin included a version of Henry Neville's Plato Redivivus and an appendix of miscellaneous Harrington works alongside the main work. Harrington's modern editor J. G. A. Pocock criticized the book for its "baroque" and confusing style.

== Summary ==
Harrington's magnum opus, Oceana is an exposition on an ideal constitution, designed to allow for the existence of a utopian republic. Oceana was read contemporaneously as a metaphor for interregnum England, with its beneficent lawgiver Olphaeus Megalator representing Cromwell. The details of this ideal governing document are set out, from the rights of the state to the salaries of low officials. Its strategies were not implemented at the time.

The first constituent in Harrington's theoretical argument states that the determining element of power in a state is property, particularly property in land. The second is that the executive power ought not to be vested for any considerable time in the same man, men, or class of men. In accordance with the first of these, Harrington recommends an agrarian law, limiting holdings of land to the amount yielding a revenue of £2000, and consequently insisting on particular modes of distributing landed property. As a practical issue of the second he lays down the rule of rotation by ballot. A third part of the executive or senate are voted out by ballot every year, and may not be elected again for three years. Harrington explains very carefully how the state and its governing parts are to be constituted by his scheme.

== Publication ==
The Commonwealth of Oceana was published in two first editions, the "Pakeman" and the "Chapman" (first names Daniel and Livewell, respectively) by the London printer John Streater, between September and November 1656. Their contents are nearly identical. The Chapman edition was listed in the Stationers' Register of 19 Sep, and was first advertised during the week of 6 Nov in the serial Mercurius Politicus, a "quasi-official" organ of the Commonwealth. The first edition of the book was seized while at the printer and taken to Whitehall. Harrington appealed to Elizabeth Claypole, Cromwell's favourite daughter; she agreed to intervene with the Lord Protector. The book went on to be published, was widely read and attacked by Henry Ferne, later Bishop of Chester, and by Matthew Wren. In 1659, an abridged version in three volumes, entitled The Art of Lawgiving, was published.

Harrington's first editor was John Toland (1670–1722), who in 1700 published The Oceana and other Works of James Harrington, with an Account of his Life. It was first reprinted in Dublin in 1737 and 1758 in a super-edition (as it were), containing a version of Henry Neville's Plato Redivivus and an appendix of miscellaneous Harrington works compiled by the Rev. Thomas Birch (1705–1766). This same appeared in London in 1747 and again in 1771.

Oceana was reprinted in Morley's Universal Library in 1883; S. B. Liljegren reissued a fastidiously prepared Pakeman edition in 1924. Much of the remaining Harrington canon consists of papers, pamphlets, aphorisms, even treatises, in steadfast defence of the controversial tract.

Modern readers might have difficulty understanding the prose. Harrington's modern editor J. G. A. Pocock considered the prose marred by what he described as an undisciplined work habit and a conspicuous "lack of sophistication." He "wrote hastily, in a baroque and periodic style in which he more than once lost his way," thereby becoming "...productive of confusion." According to Pocock, Harrington certainly never attained the level of "a great literary stylist."

== See also ==
- Milton Malsor, where Oceana was written
