= City status in the United Kingdom =

Status granted by royal charter or letters patent

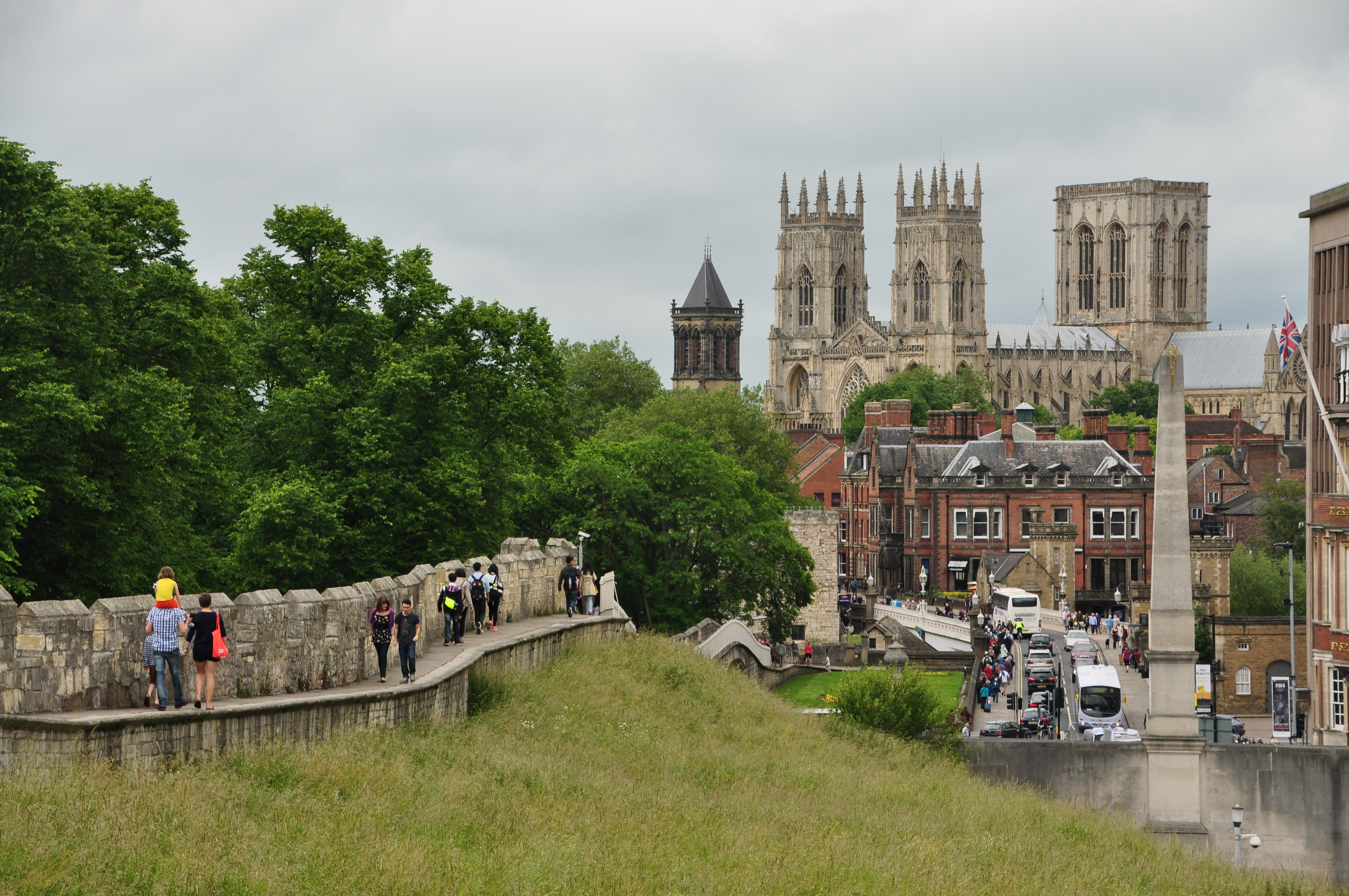
Until the 19th century, city status in England and Wales was associated with the presence of a cathedral, such as York Minster.

City status in the United Kingdom is granted by the monarch of the United Kingdom to specific centres of population, which meet the generally accepted definition of cities. As of 22 November 2022, there are 76 cities in the United Kingdom—55 in England, eight in Scotland, seven in Wales and six in Northern Ireland. Although it carries no special rights, the status of city can be a marker of prestige and confer local pride.

The status does not apply automatically on the basis of any particular criteria, though until 1889 in England and Wales it was limited to towns with diocesan cathedrals. This association between having an Anglican cathedral and being called a city was established in the early 1540s when King Henry VIII founded dioceses (each having a cathedral in the see city) in six English towns and granted them city status by issuing letters patent. A city with a cathedral is often termed a cathedral city.

City status in Ireland was granted to far fewer communities than in England and Wales, and there are only two pre-19th-century cities in present-day Northern Ireland. In Scotland, city status did not explicitly receive any recognition by the state until the 19th century. At that time, a revival of grants of city status took place, first in England, where the grants were accompanied by the establishment of new cathedrals, and later in Scotland and Ireland. In the 20th century, it was explicitly recognised that the status of city in England and Wales would no longer be bound to the presence of a cathedral, and grants made since have been awarded to communities on a variety of criteria, including population size.

The abolition of some corporate bodies as part of successive local-government reforms, beginning with the Municipal Corporations (Ireland) Act 1840, has deprived some ancient cities of their status. However, letters patent have been issued for most of the affected cities to ensure the continuation or restoration of their status. At present, Rochester and Elgin are the only former cities in the United Kingdom.

The name "City" does not, in itself, denote city status; it may be appended to place names for historic association (e.g. White City) or for marketing or disambiguation (e.g. Stratford City). A number of large towns (such as those with over 200,000 residents) in the UK are bigger than some small cities.

== History ==
=== England and Wales ===
==== Pre-19th century ====
The initial cities (Latin: civitas) of Britain were the fortified settlements organised by the Romans as the capitals of the Celtic tribes under Roman rule. The British clerics of the early Middle Ages later preserved a traditional list of the "28 Cities" (Old Welsh: cair) which was mentioned by Gildas (Note: De Excidio Britanniae, §3. (in Latin) Cited in the "Civitas" entry of Celtic Culture.) and listed by Nennius.

In the 16th century, a town was recognised as a city by the English Crown if it had a diocesan cathedral within its limits, for which 22 dioceses existed in England & Wales (see City status conferment further in the article). This association between having a cathedral and being called a city was established when Henry VIII founded new dioceses (each having a cathedral in the see city) in six English towns and also granted them city status by issuing letters patent, demonstrating these were discrete procedures. Some cities today are very small because they were granted city status in or before the 16th century, then were unaffected by population growth during the Industrial Revolution—notably Wells (population about 10,000) and St Davids (population about 2,000). After the 16th century, no new dioceses (and no new cities) were created until the 19th century in England (a further city was created in Ireland during the rule of King James I in the 17th century).

==== 1836–1888 ====
A long-awaited resumption of creating dioceses began in 1836 with Ripon. Ripon Town Council assumed that this had elevated the town to the rank of a city, and started referring to itself as the City and Borough of Ripon. The next diocese formed was Manchester and its Borough Council began informally to use the title city. When Queen Victoria visited Manchester in 1851, widespread doubts surrounding its status were raised. The pretension was ended when the borough petitioned for city status, which was granted by letters patent in 1853. This eventually forced Ripon to regularise its position; its city status was recognised by Act of Parliament in 1865. From this year Ripon bore city status whilst the rapidly expanding conurbation of Leeds – in the Ripon diocese – did not. The Manchester case established a precedent that any municipal borough in which an Anglican see was established was entitled to petition for city status. Accordingly, Truro, St Albans, Liverpool, Newcastle upon Tyne and Wakefield were all officially designated as cities between 1877 and 1888.

This was not without opposition from the Home Office, which dismissed St Albans as "a fourth or fifth rate market town" and objected to Wakefield's elevation on grounds of population. In one new diocese, Southwell, a city was not created, because it was a village without a borough corporation and therefore could not petition the Queen. The diocese covered the counties of Derbyshire and Nottinghamshire, and the boroughs of Derby and Nottingham were disappointed that they would not be able to claim the title of city.

==== 1889–1907 ====
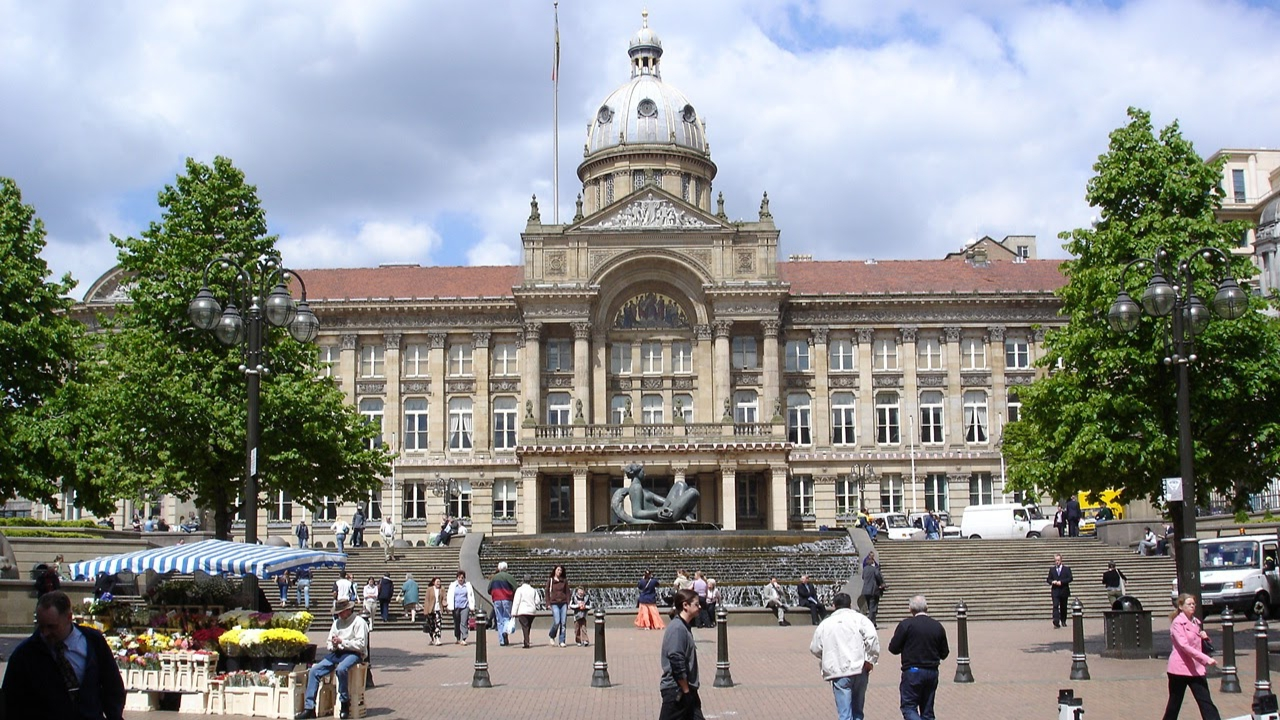
Birmingham was the first English town without an Anglican cathedral to be granted city status. Birmingham City Council meets at the Council House.

The link with Anglican dioceses was broken within England in 1889 when Birmingham successfully petitioned for city status (it was pre-empted in Ireland by Belfast in 1888) on the grounds of its large population and history of good local government. At the time of the grant, Birmingham lacked an Anglican cathedral, although the parish church later became a cathedral in 1905. This new precedent was followed by other large municipalities: Leeds and Sheffield became cities in 1893, and Bradford, Kingston upon Hull and Nottingham were honoured on the occasion of Queen Victoria's Diamond Jubilee in 1897. The last three had been the largest county boroughs outside the London area without city status.

Between 1897 and 1914, applications were received from a number of other boroughs, but only Cardiff was successful in being designated a city in 1905 and granted a Lord Mayoralty as "the Metropolis of Wales".

==== The status of Westminster ====
The London Government Act 1899 abolished the existing local authorities within the County of London and replaced them with 28 metropolitan boroughs. Among the bodies to be dissolved was the Court of Burgesses of the City of Westminster. William Burdett-Coutts, one of Westminster's members of parliament, brought forward an amendment at the committee stage to rename the proposed borough of Greater Westminster to 'City of Westminster'. This was intended to give "recognition to the title which the area ... had possessed for over three and a half centuries". He felt that if the status was not retained for the new borough it "must necessarily disappear altogether". The amendment was rejected by the committee, however, with the First Lord of the Treasury, Arthur Balfour, believing it would be "an anomaly which, I think, would be not unnaturally resented by other districts which are as large in point of population as Westminster, although doubtless not so rich in historical associations". The government eventually relented, with Balfour stating that "as soon as the necessary arrangements under the London Government Act have been completed, there will be conferred on the borough of Westminster, as constituted under the Act, the title of city, originally conferred in the time of Henry VIII". Letters patent were duly issued granting the title of "city" to the newly created Metropolitan Borough of Westminster.

==== 1907–1953 ====
In 1907, the Home Office and King Edward VII agreed on a policy that future applicants would have to meet certain criteria. This policy, which was not at the time made public, had the effect of stemming the number of city creations.

The 1907 policy contained three criteria:

- A minimum population of 300,000.
- A "local metropolitan character"—this implied that the town had a distinct identity of its own and was the centre of a wider area.
- A good record of local government.

However, well into the 20th century it was often assumed that the presence of a cathedral was sufficient to elevate a town to city status, and that for cathedral cities the city charters were recognising its city status rather than granting it. On this basis, the 1911 Encyclopædia Britannica said that Southwell and St Asaph were cities.

The policy laid down by Edward VII was continued by his successor, George V, who ascended the throne in 1910. In 1911, an application for city status by Portsmouth was refused. Explaining the Home Secretary's reason for not recommending the King to approve the petition, the Lord Advocate stated:

...during the reign of his late Majesty it was found necessary, in order to maintain the value of the distinction, to lay down a rule as to the minimum population which should ordinarily, in connexion with other considerations, be regarded as qualifying a borough for that higher status.

Following the First World War, the King made an official visit to Leicester in 1919 to commemorate its contributions to the military victory. The borough council had made several applications for city status since 1889, and took the opportunity of the visit to renew its request. Leicester had a population of approximately 230,000 at the previous census, but its petition was granted as an exception to the policy, as it was officially a restoration of a dignity lost in the past. When the county borough of Stoke-on-Trent applied for city status in 1925, it was initially refused as it had only 294,000 inhabitants. The decision was overturned, however, as it was felt to have outstanding importance as the centre of the pottery industry. The effective relaxation of the population rule led to applications from Portsmouth and Salford. The civil servants in the Home Office were minded to refuse both applications. In particular, Salford was felt to be "merely a scratch collection of 240,000 people cut off from Manchester by the river". Salford's case, however, was considered favourably by the Home Secretary, William Joynson-Hicks, who had once been a Member of Parliament (MP) for a neighbouring constituency of Manchester North West. Following protests from Portsmouth, which felt it had better credentials as a larger town and as the "first Naval Port of the kingdom", both applications were approved in 1926.

In 1927, a Royal Commission on Local Government was examining local council areas and functions in England and Wales. The question arose as to which towns were entitled to be called cities, and the chairman, the Earl of Onslow, wrote to the Home Office to seek clarification. The Home Office replied with a memorandum that read:

The title of a city which is borne by certain boroughs is a purely titular distinction. It has no connexion with the status of the borough in respect of local government and confers no powers or privileges. At the present time and for several centuries past the title has been obtained only by an express grant from the Sovereign effected by letters patent; but a certain number of cities possess the title by very ancient prescriptive right. There is no necessary connexion between the title of a city and the seat of a bishopric, and the creation of a new see neither constitutes the town concerned a city nor gives it any claim to the grant of letters patent creating it a city.

In 1928, Plymouth submitted an application for city status. As the borough had more inhabitants than Portsmouth and had absorbed Devonport and East Stonehouse, the King agreed to the request. However, he indicated that he had "come to an end of city making", and Southampton's application in the following year was turned down. In 1932 Sunderland's petition to gain city status was turned down, as was Derby's in 1935. The next city to be created was Lancaster in 1937 as part of the celebrations of the coronation of King George VI and Queen Elizabeth. With a population of a little over 50,000, Lancaster was stated to be an exception due to the town's "long association with the crown" and because it was "the county town of the King's Duchy of Lancaster". Following the Second World War, members of Cambridge Borough Council made contact with Lancaster officials for assistance in their application. Cambridge became a city in 1951, again for "exceptional" reasons, as the only ancient seat of learning in the kingdom not a city or royal burgh and to coincide with the 750th anniversary of the borough's first charter of incorporation.

==== 1953–1974 ====
It was anticipated that the coronation of Elizabeth II in 1953 would lead to the creation of a city, and Wolverhampton, Preston and Southampton made approaches; the only civic honour given was that of a lord mayoralty to Coventry. Croydon applied in 1954, but failed as it was felt not to have a sufficient identity apart from Greater London, and reports on the conduct of local government in the town were unfavourable. Derby and Southwark made unsuccessful applications in 1955. The planned reorganisations by the Local Government Commissions for England and Wales from 1958 effectively blocked new city grants. Southampton lodged a petition in 1958. Initially refused in 1959, pending the decision of the commission, it was eventually allowed in 1964. In the meantime, the administration of London was reformed under the London Government Act 1963. While the City of London was permitted to continue in existence largely unchanged, Westminster was merged with two neighbouring authorities to form a new London borough from 1 April 1965. In December 1963 it was announced that a charter was to be granted incorporating the new authority as "Westminster", and that the Queen had accepted the advice of the Home Secretary to raise the London borough to the title and dignity of city. This example, of a successor local authority to a merged local government entity taking on that former entity's city status, was to be replicated in many instances as a result of the 1972/74 local government reforms across England and Wales (see below).

With the establishment of the Royal Commission on Local Government in England in 1966, city grants were again in abeyance in England. Attempts by Derby, Teesside and Wolverhampton to become cities were not proceeded with. In Wales, Swansea campaigned for city status throughout the 1960s. The campaign came to a successful conclusion in 1969, in conjunction with the investiture of Charles, Prince of Wales.

==== 1974 reorganisation and new cities ====
The Local Government Act 1972 abolished all existing local authorities outside London (other than parish councils) in England and Wales, and created new metropolitan borough and non-metropolitan district councils. As a result, the various local authorities that held city status ceased to exist on 1 April 1974. To preserve their city status, new letters patent were issued to the most relevant borough, district or successor parish councils created by the Act. Some of these covered local government districts many times wider than the previous city, even taking in many square miles of rural land outside the urban areas, for example the cities of Bradford, Leeds and Winchester. Three non-local authority preservations arose: here charter trustees were established for the cities of Lichfield and Salisbury (or New Sarum) being neither districts nor civil parishes, and special letters patent for a time preserved the city of Rochester.

In 1977, as part of the celebrations of the Silver Jubilee of Elizabeth II, the Home Office identified nine candidates for city status: Blackburn, Brighton, Croydon, Derby, Dudley, Newport, Sandwell, Sunderland and Wolverhampton. Ultimately, Derby received the award as the largest non-metropolitan district not already designated a city. In April 1980 a parish council was created for Lichfield, and the charter trustees established six years earlier were dissolved. City status was temporarily lost until new letters patent were issued in November of the same year. In 1992, on the fortieth anniversary of the monarch's accession, it was announced that another town would be elevated to a city. An innovation on this occasion was that a competition was to be held, and communities would be required to submit applications. Sunderland was the successful applicant. This was followed in 1994 by the restoration of the dignity to St David's, historic see of a bishop. Since 2000, city status has been awarded to towns or local government districts by competition on special occasions. A large number of towns have applied for the honour in recent decades including Blackpool, Colchester, Croydon, Gateshead, Ipswich, Middlesbrough, Milton Keynes, Reading, Swindon and Warrington. Four successful applicants in England and two in Wales were granted city status between 2000 and 2012. For the Millennium celebrations in 2000, city status was awarded to Brighton and Hove and Wolverhampton; for the Queen's Golden Jubilee in 2002, it was awarded to Preston and Newport; and for the Queen's Diamond Jubilee in 2012, to Chelmsford and St Asaph.

==== 2021 bids for city status ====
From June 2021, submissions for city status were invited to mark the Platinum Jubilee of Elizabeth II in 2022. Places submitting bids (some for a second or subsequent time) included Bangor (Northern Ireland), Bournemouth, Doncaster, Dunfermline, Dudley, Marazion, Middlesbrough, Milton Keynes, Reading, St Andrews and Wrexham. Bids were also accepted from overseas territories and crown dependencies for the first time. The competition closed on 8 December 2021 with 39 locations on the shortlist, and the winners were to be announced in June 2022.

On 18 October 2021, the Prime Minister announced in Parliament that the Queen, in advance of the closing date, would accord city status to one of the applicants, Southend-on-Sea. This was in memory of Sir David Amess, the town's MP who was murdered three days earlier and had long pressed for the status. City status was officially granted by letters patent dated 26 January 2022. They were presented to Southend Borough Council by Charles, Prince of Wales, on 1 March 2022.

An announcement on 20 May 2022 declared that eight new cities were to be created from the shortlist, with at least one in every UK country as well as in overseas locations. In England, Milton Keynes, Colchester and Doncaster were to be the recipients of the honour. Dunfermline, a previous royal capital of Scotland, was granted the privilege. Bangor in Northern Ireland was also a recipient, and the title in Wales was granted to Wrexham. These awards increased the number of official mainland cities to 76, with 55 in England, eight in Scotland, seven in Wales, six in Northern Ireland.

==== Greater London ====
Other than the City of London and the City of Westminster, no local authorities in the Greater London area have been granted city status. The Home Office had a policy of resisting any attempt by metropolitan boroughs to become cities even when their populations, and other proposed claims as qualifying criteria, might otherwise have made them eligible. It was felt that such a grant would undermine the status of the two existing cities in the capital. The Metropolitan Borough of Southwark made a number of applications, but in 1955 the borough's town clerk was told not to pursue the matter any further. Outside the boundaries of the county, the County Borough of Croydon made three applications, all of which were dismissed as it was not seen as being sufficiently separate from London. When the successor London Borough of Croydon applied in 1965 the Assistant Under Secretary of State summarised the case against Croydon: "...whatever its past history, it is now just part of the London conurbation and almost indistinguishable from many of the other Greater London boroughs".

The same objections were made when the London Boroughs of Croydon and Southwark unsuccessfully entered the competition for city status to mark the millennium: Croydon was said to have "no particular identity of its own" while Southwark was "part of London with little individual identity". When the competition was held to mark the Golden Jubilee of 2002, Croydon made a sixth application, again unsuccessful. It was joined by the London Borough of Greenwich, which emphasised its royal and maritime connections, while claiming to be "to London what Versailles is to Paris". In this vein Greenwich joined Kingston-upon-Thames and Kensington and Chelsea in London in having the title of Royal Borough in 2012.

==== Rochester ====
Rochester was recognised as a city from 1211 to 1998. On 1 April 1974, the city council was abolished, becoming part of the Borough of Medway, a local government district in the county of Kent. However, under letters patent the former city council area was to continue to be styled the "City of Rochester" to "perpetuate the ancient name" and to recall "the long history and proud heritage of the said city". The city was unique, as it had no council or charter trustees and no mayor or civic head. In 1979, the Borough of Medway was renamed as Rochester-upon-Medway, and in 1982 further letters patent transferred the city status to the entire borough.

On 1 April 1998, the existing local government districts of Rochester-upon-Medway and Gillingham were abolished and became the new unitary authority of Medway. Since it was the local government district that officially held city status under the 1982 letters patent, when it was abolished, it also ceased to be a city. Whilst the two other local government districts with city status (Bath and Hereford) that were abolished around this time decided to appoint charter trustees to maintain the existence of the city and the mayoralty, Rochester-upon-Medway City Council did not do so. Medway Council apparently only became aware of this when, in 2002, they discovered that Rochester was not on the Lord Chancellor's Office's list of cities. The council campaigned unsuccessfully to be one of 2012 Diamond Jubilee cities. The campaign's "City of Medway" logo was used on a council tourism leaflet titled "Historic Rochester and Maritime Chatham" until the Advertising Standards Authority upheld a 2010 complaint that it misleadingly implied Medway had "officially been granted city status" because "readers of the leaflet were likely to be aware of [the] official definition of a city".

=== Scotland ===
Scotland had no cities by royal charter or letters patent before 1889. The nearest equivalent in pre-Union Scotland was the royal burgh. The term city was not always consistently applied, and there were doubts over the number of officially designated cities. The royal burghs of Edinburgh and Perth anciently used the title civitas, but the term city does not seem to have been used before the 15th century. Unlike the situation in England, in Scotland there was no link between the presence of a cathedral and the title of city. Aberdeen, Glasgow and Edinburgh were accepted as cities by ancient usage by the 18th century, while Perth and Elgin also used the title. In 1856, the burgh of Dunfermline resolved to use the title of city in all official documents in the future, based on long usage and its former status as a royal capital. The status was not officially recognised until 2022.

In 1889, Dundee was granted city status by letters patent. The grant by formal document led to doubts about the use of the title city by other burghs. In 1891, the city status of Aberdeen was confirmed when the burgh was enlarged by local Act of Parliament. The Royal Burgh of Inverness applied for promotion to a city as part of the Jubilee honours in 1897. The request was not granted, partly because it would draw attention to the lack of any charter granting the title to existing cities. Aberdeen, Dundee, Edinburgh and Glasgow were constituted "counties of cities" by the Local Government (Scotland) Act 1929. The Act made no statement on the title city for any other burgh. In 1969, the Home Secretary, James Callaghan, stated that there were six cities in Scotland (without naming them) and Aberdeen, Dundee, Edinburgh, Elgin, Glasgow and Perth were the only burghs listed as cities in 1972.

The Local Government (Scotland) Act 1973 completely reorganised Scotland's local administration in 1975. All burghs were abolished, and a system of districts created. The four districts of Aberdeen, Edinburgh, Dundee and Glasgow had City included in their titles by the Act. The 1975 districts were replaced with the present council areas in 1996 by the Local Government etc. (Scotland) Act 1994, and the same four cities were designated. Since the 1996 reorganisation, four more Scottish cities have been designated: Inverness as part of the millennium celebrations, Stirling in 2002 to commemorate Queen Elizabeth II's Golden Jubilee, Perth in 2012 to mark the Queen's Diamond Jubilee and Dunfermline in 2022 to mark the Queen's Platinum Jubilee. In the case of these four cities, there are no city councils and no formal boundaries. In January 2008, a petition to matriculate armorial bearings for the City of Inverness was refused by Lord Lyon King of Arms on the grounds that there is no corporate body or legal persona to whom arms can be granted. In February 2024 the Provost of Fife, the council area containing Dunfermline, petitioned Lord Lyon to matriculate arms for the city. Arms were duly granted to the 'Provost of Fife for and on behalf of the City of Dunfermline' in August of that year.

=== Ireland and Northern Ireland ===
City status in Ireland tended historically to be granted by royal charter. There are many towns in Ireland with Church of Ireland cathedrals that have never been called cities. In spite of this, Armagh was considered a city, by virtue of its being the seat of the Primate of All Ireland, until the abolition of Armagh's city corporation by the Municipal Corporations (Ireland) Act 1840. The only historic city with a charter in present-day Northern Ireland is Derry. The garrison town of Derry was attacked and destroyed by Cahir O'Doherty in 1608. The present city status is the result of a Royal Charter granted in 1615 to The Honourable The Irish Society as part of the Plantation of Ulster, providing for the building of a walled city, which was named "Londonderry" in recognition of the London Guilds that established the Society.

In 1887, the Golden Jubilee of Queen Victoria was celebrated, and the Borough of Belfast submitted a memorial to the Lord Lieutenant of Ireland seeking city status. Belfast based its claim on its similarity to two English boroughs that had received the honour—the seaport of Liverpool and the textile centre of Manchester—and the fact that it had (at the time) a larger population than the City of Dublin. Following some legal debate, city status was conferred in 1888. The grant of the honour on the grounds of being a large industrial town, rather than a diocesan centre, was unprecedented. Belfast's example was soon followed by Birmingham in England and Dundee in Scotland.

In 1994, Armagh's city status was restored. In 2002, Lisburn and Newry were two of the five towns in the UK that were granted city status by Queen Elizabeth II to mark her Golden Jubilee. In the case of Lisburn, the status extended to the entire local government district. Newry, like Inverness and Stirling in Scotland, has no formal boundaries or city council. The letters patent were presented to representatives of Newry and Mourne District Council on behalf of the city.

=== Crown colonies and British Overseas Territories ===
During the British Empire, the Colonial Office had the power to declare cities in Crown colonies by letters patent when appointing bishops. When the Bishop of Guyana was created in 1842, Georgetown (then part of British Guiana) was officially declared the "City of Georgetown". The same process was followed for Gibraltar, Jamestown, St Helena, Bridgetown, Barbados, St. John's, Antigua and Barbuda, Victoria, Hong Kong and Nassau, Bahamas. Most of these have since gained independence from the United Kingdom, but Gibraltar and St Helena remain British Overseas Territories. This practice ended in 1865, and led to legal disputes about whether these letters patent were valid or not in territories with responsible government (primarily those in present-day Australia, Canada, New Zealand and South Africa). Goulburn in Australia for example found itself declared a city twice – once by letters patent in 1863 and once by law in 1885 after doubts arose to its status.

Hamilton, Bermuda was named as a city in 1897 as part of the celebration of the Diamond Jubilee of Queen Victoria. Since the second Millennium, competitions have been arranged by the UK government to grant the status to settlements. In 2021 submissions for city status were invited to mark the Platinum Jubilee of Elizabeth II, with Crown Dependencies and British Overseas Territories being allowed to take part for the first time. The applicants were George Town (in the Cayman Islands), Gibraltar, Stanley (in the Falkland Islands), Douglas and Peel (both in the Isle of Man). It was later discovered that Gibraltar had been previously named a city, researchers at The National Archives confirming that Gibraltar's city status was still in effect, with the territory missing from the official list of cities for the past 140 years. Stanley and Douglas were later granted the honour, and after confirmations this will take the overseas total to five cities.

== Current practice of granting city status ==
According to a Memorandum from the Home Office issued in 1927,

If a town wishes to obtain the title of a city the proper method of procedure is to address a petition to the King through the Home Office. It is the duty of the Home Secretary to submit such petitions to his Majesty and to advise his Majesty to the reply to be returned. It is a well-established principle that the grant of the title is only recommended in the case of towns of the first rank in population, size and importance, and having a distinctive character and identity of their own. At the present day, therefore, it is only rarely and in exceptional circumstances that the title is given.

A town can now apply for city status by submitting an application to the Lord Chancellor, who makes recommendations to the sovereign. Competitions for new grants of city status have been held to mark special events, such as coronations, royal jubilees or the Millennium.

=== Lord mayors ===
Some cities in England, Wales and Northern Ireland have the further distinction of having a lord mayor rather than just a mayor – in Scotland, the equivalent is the lord provost. Lord mayors have the right to be styled "The Right Worshipful The Lord Mayor". The lord mayors and provosts of Belfast, Cardiff, Edinburgh, Glasgow, the City of London and York have the further right to be styled "The Right Honourable the Lord Mayor" (or Provost), although they are not members of the Privy Council as this style usually indicates. The style is associated with the office, not the person holding it. (Note: so "The Right Worshipful John Smith" would be incorrect.)

There are currently 31 lord mayoralties or lord provostships in the UK: 23 lord mayoralties in England, two lord mayoralties in Wales, four lord provostships in Scotland and two lord mayoralties in Northern Ireland.

In the Republic of Ireland, the ceremonial head of the city government of Dublin is the Lord Mayor of Dublin. This title was granted by Charles II in 1665 when Dublin was part of the Kingdom of Ireland. Whilst the 1665 letters patent provided for the Lord Mayor to hold the formal title of Right Honourable, this was repealed in 2001. There is also a Lord Mayor of Cork, a title granted in 1900 when Cork was part of the (then) United Kingdom of Great Britain and Ireland.

In modern practice, competitions are held for cities that wish to gain the distinction of a lord mayor. The 2002 competition was entered by Bath, Cambridge, Carlisle, Chichester, Derby, Exeter, Gloucester, Lancaster, Lincoln, St Albans, St Davids, Salford, Southampton, Sunderland, Truro, Wolverhampton and Worcester; the successful candidate was Exeter. In 2012 a further competition was held, as part of the Diamond Jubilee celebrations, with Armagh receiving the distinction. Other than Armagh, eleven cities had entered the contest in 2012, namely: Cambridge, Derby, Gloucester, Lancaster, Newport, Peterborough, Salford, Southampton, St Albans, Sunderland, and Wakefield.

=== Local government districts ===
Since local government reorganisation in 1974 city status has been awarded to a number of local government districts which are not themselves towns. Each includes a number of towns and villages outside the urban area from which the district takes its name. In some of these cases city status was awarded to districts where the largest settlement had city status before 1974. In other cases a borough was formed to govern an area covering several towns and then city status was granted to the borough. The largest "city" district in terms of area was until 1 April 2023 the City of Carlisle, which covered some 400 square miles (1,000 km^{2}) of mostly rural landscape in the north of England, and was larger than smaller counties such as Merseyside or Rutland. (The largest now is the City of Winchester at 250 square miles (650 km^{2}).) Such cities include:

- City of Bradford (metropolitan borough in West Yorkshire), including the towns of Bingley, Ilkley, Keighley and Shipley as well as Bradford
- City of Canterbury (non-metropolitan district in Kent), including the towns of Herne Bay and Whitstable as well as Canterbury
- City of Lancaster (non-metropolitan district in Lancashire), including the towns of Carnforth, Heysham and Morecambe as well as Lancaster and surrounding rural areas.
- City of Leeds (metropolitan borough in West Yorkshire), including the towns of Otley, Pudsey and Wetherby as well as Leeds
- City of Peterborough (unitary authority in the ceremonial county of Cambridgeshire), including rural areas as well as Peterborough
- City of Preston (non-metropolitan district in Lancashire), including rural areas as well as Preston
- City of St Albans (non-metropolitan district in Hertfordshire), including the town of Harpenden as well as St Albans
- City of Salford (metropolitan borough in Greater Manchester), including the towns of Eccles, Pendlebury and Swinton as well as Salford
- City of Sunderland (metropolitan borough in Tyne and Wear), including the towns of Hetton-le-Hole, Houghton-le-Spring and Washington as well as Sunderland
- City of Wakefield (metropolitan borough in West Yorkshire), including the towns of Castleford, Normanton, Ossett and Pontefract as well as Wakefield
- City of Winchester (non-metropolitan district in Hampshire), including the towns of Bishop's Waltham and New Alresford as well as Winchester

There are some cities where the local government district is in fact smaller than the historical or natural boundaries of the city. Examples include: Manchester, where the traditional area associated includes areas of the neighbouring authorities of Trafford, Tameside, Oldham, Bury and the City of Salford; Kingston upon Hull, where surrounding areas and villages that are effectively suburbs, such as Cottingham, come under East Riding of Yorkshire Council; Glasgow, where suburban areas of the city are located in East Dunbartonshire, East Renfrewshire, North Lanarkshire, Renfrewshire, South Lanarkshire and West Dunbartonshire.

=== City councils ===
The holding of city status gives a settlement no special rights other than that of calling itself a "city". Nonetheless, this appellation carries its own prestige and, consequently, competitions for the status are hard-fought.

Historically, city status could only be granted to incorporated towns. The grant was specifically awarded to the relevant local government area such as a civil parish or borough. However, recent grants have used a looser wording, where the status is awarded to the "town". In most cases the "town" is held to be coterminous with the relevant local government area, such that the city status holder is the corporate body of the council. Examples include the Letters Patent awarded to the "Towns of Brighton and Hove", the "Town of Wolverhampton" and the "Town of Newport in the County Borough of Newport". In each case the existing borough council became the city council. Applications for the 2022 Platinum Jubilee honours were to be made "by an elected local authority for its entire area or a distinct area within its boundary".

Most cities have city councils, which have varying powers depending on the country and type of settlement.

==== England ====
Thirteen of the 55 cities in England are in metropolitan counties and their city councils are single-tier metropolitan district councils. Outside the metropolitan counties fourteen cities are unitary authorities, and fourteen have ordinary district councils, which are subordinate to their local county council. In London the Westminster City Council functions as a London borough council, and the City of London Corporation is the council for the City of London. Eight smaller episcopal cities such as Ripon and Wells are neither local government districts nor within a 'local government district with city status', and have city councils which are parish councils, with limited powers. Three cities (Bath, Carlisle and Chester) have no city council, while Durham has a 'city' parish council; these, however, maintain the status through charter trustees on behalf of their prior district areas which held city status before being abolished in 1996 (Bath), 2009 (Chester, Durham) and 2023 (Carlisle).

==== Scotland ====
Aberdeen, Dundee, Edinburgh and Glasgow are themselves council areas and have their own city councils. The cities of Dunfermline, Perth, Stirling and Inverness are part of council areas which do not have city status, and have no city councils. Stirling Council's application for city status was specifically for the urban area of the (now former) Royal Burgh of Stirling and included proposed city boundaries which are much smaller than Stirling council area.

==== Wales ====
Cardiff, Newport, and Swansea are principal areas and have city councils. Wrexham, being awarded the status in 2022, still maintains its county borough council as of April 2023. The city councils of Bangor, St Asaph and St Davids are community councils with limited powers.

==== Northern Ireland ====
Belfast City Council is a local government district council. Since the local government reforms of 2015 the four other cities of Armagh, Derry, Lisburn and Newry form parts of wider districts and do not have their own councils.

=== City status conferment ===
City status is conferred by letters patent and not by a royal charter (except historically in Ireland). There are twenty towns in England and Wales that were recognised as cities by "ancient prescriptive right"; none of these communities had been formally declared a city, but they had all used the title since "time immemorial" (legally defined as before 3 September 1189) and had been granted some form of privilege such as freedoms by way of a charter or being given borough or corporation status. These ancient cities as listed by the Home Office in 1927:

- Bangor (Wales)
- Bath
- Canterbury
- Carlisle
- Chichester
- Coventry
- Durham
- Ely
- Exeter
- Hereford
- Lichfield
- Lincoln
- City of London
- Norwich
- Rochester (status lost in 1998)
- Salisbury
- Wells
- Winchester
- Worcester
- York

These twenty cities were concurrent with 22 ancient diocese (pre-English Reformation) locations. Bath and Wells being one diocese and Coventry cathedral having shared the Diocese of Lichfield pre-reformation, the remaining four places were:

- Llandaff – had not been incorporated as a borough or granted privileges so was not deemed a city. It was merged into the existing city of Cardiff in 1922;
- St Asaph – was never considered to be a city due to a lack of honours or charters, however it was later awarded the status in 2012;
- St Davids – had been a borough, yet lost the status in 1886 (so did not appear in the above list). The title of city was restored in 1994;
- Peel, Isle of Man – although the location of the cathedral for the Sodor and Man diocese, the island only came under English control after the time immemorial period and Peel has never been considered a city.

The holding of city status brings no special benefits other than the right to be called a city. All cities where a local government unit that holds that status is abolished have to be re-issued with letters patent reconfirming city status following local government reorganisation where that holder has been abolished. This process was followed by a number of cities since 1974, and York and Hereford's status was confirmed twice, in 1974 and again in the 1990s. Failure to do so leads to the loss of city status as happened at Rochester in 1998 (see above), and also previously in St David's and Armagh, although both of these latter have regained city status since losing it. These three had been cities since time immemorial before the loss of city status.

== Officially designated cities ==
There are currently 76 officially designated cities in the UK, of which 17 have been created since 2000 in competitions to celebrate the new millennium and Queen Elizabeth II's Golden Jubilee in 2002, Diamond Jubilee in 2012, and Platinum Jubilee in 2022. The designation is highly sought after, with over 40 communities submitting bids at recent competitions.

City status has been applied to a variety of entities including towns, local government districts and civil parishes.

== Smallest and largest cities ==
While cities are regularly ranked by the number of residents, this is not an ideal measure. Population can vary based on the number and type of residences present, and has to be limited to an area. The official area of a city in the UK is typically the coverage up to a local government/council boundary, there being a variety of council bodies. However, there are exceptions depending on the UK constituent country and whether the council has since been abolished.

Such a boundary can typically contain a built up (urban) area, and a surrounding, less populated rural landscape. Or the area of a city can be entirely built up, with that urban environment spilling over a boundary into another area which does not have city status. That wider urban area can still be considered in everyday parlance locally as a whole 'city' although it is not a formal designation.

With the 'square mile' City of London being in the middle of a huge urban area, it can be suggested that 'small' should be applied to only cities with minimal urban areas that have nearby surrounding areas of countryside and so is visibly representative of the term, the city of Wells being more suitable in this regard as the smallest standalone city council area. Therefore, sizing can be interpreted in a number of ways, and below are top 5 lists of the smallest and largest cities ranked by population, city council area, and urban area.

All statistics are 2021 census figures.
Population is of the total residents in the city council area. Armagh (no local council) and the Largest Urban Area table both use urban population figures.

=== Largest ===
Largest by population
1	Birmingham	1,144,919	England
2	Leeds	811,956	England
3	Glasgow	620,700 (rounded)	Scotland
4	Sheffield	556,521	England
5	Manchester	551,938	England

Largest by city council area (Note: Excludes cities that do not have their own councils or have other settlements in their council name.)
1	City of Winchester	255.20 sq mi (660.96 km^{2})	England
2	City of Lancaster	222.34 sq mi (575.86 km^{2})	England
3	City of Doncaster	219.30 sq mi (567.98 km^{2})	England
4	City of Leeds	213.02 sq mi (551.72 km^{2})	England
5	Wrexham	194.5 sq mi (503.75 km^{2})	Wales

Largest by overall urban area
	City	Area	Nation	Population (2011)
1	City of London/City of Westminster (Greater London BUA)	670.99 sq mi (1,737.86 km^{2})	England	9,787,426
2	Manchester/Salford (Greater Manchester BUA)	243.34 sq mi (630.25 km^{2})	England	2,553,379
3	Birmingham/Wolverhampton (West Midlands BUA)	231.23 sq mi (598.88 km^{2})	England	2,440,986
4	Leeds/Bradford/Wakefield (West Yorkshire UA)	188.34 sq mi (487.80 km^{2})	England	1,777,934
5	Glasgow (Greater Glasgow)	142.28 sq mi (368.50 km^{2})	Scotland	1,209,143

== Towns not cities ==
=== Populous towns ===
'City' can refer to any large settlement, with no fixed limit but there are British towns with large urban areas that could qualify for city status on the grounds of population size. Some have applied for city status and had the application turned down. The report "Key Statistics for Built-Up Areas 2011" published by the Office for National Statistics showed that, at the 2011 Census, the following were the largest urban areas in the United Kingdom not having a city as a component:

Populous built-up areas without cities
Built-up area (largest town in area)	Population 2011 Pop.
Bournemouth/Poole (Bournemouth)	466,266
Teesside (Middlesbrough)	376,633
Birkenhead	325,264
Reading and Wokingham	318,014
Luton and Dunstable	258,018
Farnborough/Aldershot (Farnborough)	252,397
Medway Towns (Gillingham) (the former city of Rochester is part of this area)	243,931
Blackpool	239,409
Barnsley/Dearne Valley (Barnsley)	223,281
Northampton	215,963
Swindon	185,609
Warrington	165,456
Telford	147,980

The largest local authorities to have been unsuccessful in applying for city status in recent competitions are:

- London Borough of Croydon – 390,719
- Metropolitan Borough of Dudley – 312,925
- Metropolitan Borough of Wirral – 312,293
- Metropolitan Borough of Stockport – 284,528
- Metropolitan Borough of Bolton – 261,037
- Borough of Medway – 249,488
- London Borough of Southwark – 244,866
- London Borough of Tower Hamlets – 220,500
- London Borough of Greenwich – 214,403 (became a Royal Borough on 3 February 2012)
- Metropolitan Borough of Gateshead – 200,300
- Borough of Northampton – 194,458 (borough abolished in 2021 and now part of West Northamptonshire, It was one of the most populous districts not to be a London borough, metropolitan borough, unitary authority or city; on this basis, the former borough council claimed that it is the largest town in England. The town remains one of the most populous civil parish in the UK.)
- Borough of Warrington – 191,084
- Borough of Luton – 184,371
- Borough of Bournemouth – 183,491 (borough abolished and now forms part of Bournemouth, Christchurch and Poole)
- Borough of Swindon – 180,051
- Borough of Telford and Wrekin – 161,600
- Borough of Reading – 155,300
- Borough of Blackpool – 142,100
- Borough of Middlesbrough – 138,400

=== Cathedral towns ===
A "cathedral city" is a place designated as a city which has a cathedral.

==== England and Wales ====
Since being the seat of an Anglican diocese is no longer sufficient or necessary to gain city status, some cathedral towns exist:

Town	Anglican cathedral	Diocese established	Population (est)
Blackburn	Blackburn Cathedral	1926	105,085
Guildford	Guildford Cathedral	1927	70,000
Bury St Edmunds	St Edmundsbury Cathedral	1914	35,015
Rochester	Rochester Cathedral	604; previously a city (see above)	27,000
Brecon	Brecon Cathedral	1923	7,901
Southwell	Southwell Minster	1884	6,900

The 1911 Encyclopædia Britannica referred to Southwell as a city, a photograph of the Football XI sitting on the steps of Norwood Park (home since 1888 of the Starkey Bramley) in 1954 is titled Southwell City F.C. and in 1949 Bury St Edmunds was referred to as a city.

There are 16 English and Welsh cities that have never had Anglican cathedrals within their borders – Brighton and Hove, Cambridge, Hull, Lancaster, Leeds, Milton Keynes, Nottingham, Plymouth, Preston, Salford, Southampton, Southend-on-Sea, Stoke-on-Trent, Sunderland, Swansea, and Wolverhampton.

Bath Abbey was once a diocesan cathedral, as was Westminster Abbey briefly during the reign of Henry VIII. These cities retained their city status despite their cathedrals losing that status.

==== Scotland ====
The national church of Scotland, the Church of Scotland, is presbyterian in governance (not recognising authority of bishops), and thus has high kirks rather than cathedrals. However, the pre-Reformation dioceses do have extant cathedrals, most notably at Glasgow and Aberdeen, which remain in use by the Church of Scotland and continue to bear the honorific title of cathedral. Others (such as that of St Andrews) are now in ruins.

Both Perth and Elgin were recognised as cities before 1975; Perth's city status was restored in 2012. Additionally, five other pre-Reformation sees—Brechin, Dunblane, Dunkeld, Kirkwall and St Andrews—are often referred to as cities, notably in names associated with the settlements (e.g. 'City of Brechin and District' community council. and Brechin City F.C., City Road in St Andrews). Dornoch, Fortrose, Lismore, Saddell and Whithorn also possess pre-Reformation cathedrals but have never been described as cities.

Towns with non-Church of Scotland, post-Reformation cathedrals which are not recognised as cities are Ayr (R.C.), Millport (Episcopal), Oban (R.C.), Motherwell (R.C.) and Paisley (R.C.). Of these, Ayr, Motherwell and Paisley have larger populations than Perth, Stirling and Inverness, and both Ayr and Paisley have formally made a bid for city status during the millennium competition.

Of settlements granted city status in the 21st century, Inverness (awarded 2001) possesses an Episcopal cathedral (1866), but none under the auspices of the Church of Scotland. Stirling (awarded 2002) has never had a cathedral of any kind. Perth (reinstated 2012) has an Episcopal cathedral dating from 1860, but no pre-Reformation establishment.

==== Northern Ireland ====
In Northern Ireland, possession of a diocesan cathedral has never (except in the anomalous case of Armagh) been sufficient to attain this status. The Church of Ireland was disestablished in 1871, The 1911 Encyclopædia Britannica did refer to Armagh (which lost city status in 1840) and Lisburn as cities. Armagh subsequently regained city status formally in 1994, and Lisburn achieved city status in 2002.

There are four towns in Northern Ireland with Church of Ireland cathedrals that do not have city status—Clogher, Downpatrick, Dromore and Enniskillen.

Newry is the only city in Northern Ireland that does not have a Church of Ireland cathedral within its borders.

=== Claimants ===
A number of towns describe themselves as cities in some contexts, despite not having the requisite charter.

- Ballymena in Northern Ireland has been known informally as "The City of the Seven Towers" since the nineteenth century.
- The community council for Brechin is called City of Brechin & District Community Council. The local football team is known as Brechin City F.C. (they were formed at a meeting on City Road in the town). Brechin also possesses a cathedral, and was the ancient seat of the see of Brechin.
- Dunkeld, the see of a bishop until the seventeenth century is sometimes referred to as a city. A "City Hall" was built in 1877, since converted into a holiday accommodation.
- The community council for Elgin is called City and Royal Burgh of Elgin Community Council. The local football team is known as Elgin City F.C.
- Guildford possesses a cathedral and the local football team is named Guildford City F.C. In 2013 the local council did not submit an application, citing low chance of success, and high time and resource against low benefits ratio.
- Letchworth Garden City and Welwyn Garden City are medium-sized New Towns in Hertfordshire established to reduce the overcrowding of London as part of the Garden city movement.
- After its unsuccessful attempts to gain city status, the town of Reading, Berkshire, started using the phrase "City Centre" on its buses and car-park signs. Reading's urban area has in excess of 350,000 inhabitants, making it one of the largest urban areas in the UK and larger than many sizeable cities including Southampton, Kingston upon Hull and Derby. However, the population of the Borough of Reading was estimated as 142,800 in 2006 by the Office for National Statistics, as a number of the town's large eastern and southern suburbs (such as Earley and Woodley) lie within neighbouring local authorities.

== See also ==
- List of cities in the United Kingdom
- Borough status in the United Kingdom
- List of towns in the United Kingdom
- List of place names with royal patronage in the United Kingdom
- List of urban areas in the United Kingdom
- List of smallest cities in the United Kingdom
- City status in Ireland
- City status
