= 2027 Bracknell Forest Borough Council election =

2027 election in England

- 6 May 2027

All 41 seats to Bracknell Forest Borough Council 21 seats needed for a majority
Leader	Helen Purnell	Gareth Barnard
Party	Labour	Conservative
Leader since	23 March 2026	2023
Leader's seat	Easthampstead & Wildridings	Whitegrove
Last election	22 seats, 30.4%	10 seats, 42.4%
Current seats	20	10
Leader	Mike Forster	Adrian Haffegee/Sheila Collings
Party	Liberal Democrats	Green
Leader since	2023	2023
Leader's seat	Sandhurst	Binfield North & Warfield West
Last election	7 seats, 17.0%	2 seats, 8.4%
Current seats	8	3
Incumbent Leader
Helen Purnell
Labour

The 2027 Bracknell Forest Borough Council election will take place on 6 May 2027 to elect all 41 councillors in 15 wards for Bracknell Forest Borough Council in England. The election will take place on the same day as other local elections in England as part of the 2027 United Kingdom local elections, and will be held alongside concurrent town and parish council elections in Binfield, Bracknell, Crowthorne, Sandhurst, Warfield, and Winkfield.

The Labour Party will attempt to win a historic second term in office, whilst the Conservative Party will try to regain control of a council it has run for 45 of the past 53 years. The Liberal Democrats will attempt to build on its record result in 2023, as will the Green Party which entered the council for the first time. Though it holds no seats, Reform UK are expected to be a major player.

== Background ==
In 2023, the 26-year Conservative Party administration fell to a record defeat, giving power to the Labour Party for the first time since 1997. Labour has never won a second term. There were accusations that Labour's win was the result of a progressive alliance with the Liberal Democrats and - to an extent - the Green Party, whereby the parties stood aside in wards it deemed unwinnable. These accusations were denied by the local parties.

The Labour administration has received both positive and negative press coverage. On the one hand, the council's children services retained their Outstanding rating by Ofsted in January 2026, and has received positive marks for its action on climate change. Likewise, in 2025, Bracknell Forest was rated 4th in the UK Better Lives Index. Conversely, in March 2026, the Labour leader, Cllr Mary Temperton, and Cabinet member Cllr Roy Bailey, were suspended from the Labour Party after fundraising money for a former Labour councillor and mayor, Naheed Ejaz, who was subsequently convicted and jailed for perverting the course of justice in relation to her son and mayoral consort, Diwan Khan, who was convicted of raping a 15-year old girl.

Subsequently, it emerged that Diwan Khan had been improperly given his taxi licence under the previous Conservative administration. The Labour administration had already lost its majority on the council after Cllrs Egglestone and Welch had left the group in 2025. In July 2026, Cllr Egglestone joined the Green group, whilst Cllrs Temperton and Bailey rejoined the Labour group pending the conclusion of the party's disciplinary process. In November 2026, Cllr Welch joined the Liberal Democrats.
