= 2021 Northampton Town Council election =

Local election in England

- May 6, 2021

All 25 seats on Northampton Town Council 13 seats needed for a majority
	First party	Second party	Third party
Party	Labour	Conservative	Liberal Democrats
Seats won	17	7	1

The 2021 Northampton Town Council election was held on 6 May 2021 to elect councillors to Northampton Town Council. This was the inaugural election for the newly established town council and the first since the abolition of the previous Northampton Borough Council.

== Results by ward ==
Abington ward (2-member)
Party	Candidate	Votes	%	±%
Labour	Bob PURSER	1,246		
Labour	Walter Wlodek TARASIEWICZ	1,045		
Conservative	Tony ANSELL	689		
Conservative	John SCHULTES	539		
Liberal Democrats	James Robert TARRY	377		
Turnout		2257	30.52	

Boothville
Party	Candidate	Votes	%	±%
Conservative	Jamie William LANE	892		
Labour	Ian Paul CHURMS	385		
Turnout		1286	37.91	

Briar Hill
Party	Candidate	Votes	%	±%
Conservative	Raymond CONNOLLY	443		
Labour	Ben FRANCOISE	398		
Turnout		857	27.59	

Brookside
Party	Candidate	Votes	%	±%
Labour	Naz CHOUDARY	595		
Conservative	Imogen MCKEE	450		
Turnout		1060	26.48	

Castle (3-member)
Party	Candidate	Votes	%	±%
Labour	Jamal ALWAHABI	1,528		
Labour	HAQUE Enam	1,492		
Labour	Fartun ISMAIL	1,443		
Conservative	Daniel Bell BATTEN	654		
Conservative	Maqsood Ahmed CHAUDHRY	518		
Conservative	Maroof IFTIKHAR	434		
Turnout		2534	23.41	

Eastfield (1-member)
Party	Candidate	Votes	%	±%
Labour	Paul JOYCE	600		
Conservative	Mobola BAKARE	436		
Liberal Democrats	Tom Lawler	197		
Turnout		1248	32.58	

Headlands (1-member)
Party	Candidate	Votes	%	±%
Labour	Turon Miah	592		
Conservative	Aziz Rahman	394		
Liberal Democrats	Derry Owen Collins	250		
Turnout		1259	32.37	

Kings Heath (1-member)
Party	Candidate	Votes	%	±%
Labour	Terrie Eales	458		
Conservative	Paul Leslie Clark	265		
Turnout		3503	20.90	

Kingsley (1-member)
Party	Candidate	Votes	%	±%
Labour	Cathrine RUSSELL	773		
Conservative	Lori GALE-RUMENS	453		
Turnout		1243	30.00	

Park (1-member)
Party	Candidate	Votes	%	±%
Conservative	Andrew Cameron Kilbride	1,102		
Labour	Gary Campbell	425		
Liberal Democrats	David Garlick	290		
Turnout		1827	47.88	

Parklands (1-member)
Party	Candidate	Votes	%	±%
Conservative	Mike Hallam	1,030		
Labour	Koulla Jolley	395		
Turnout		1444	39.00	

Phippsville (1-member)
Party	Candidate	Votes	%	±%
Labour	Andrew James STEVENS	584		
Conservative	Iftikhar Choudary	390		
Liberal Democrats	Martin Thomas Sawyer	321		
Turnout		1310	41.43	

Rectory Farm (1-member)
Party	Candidate	Votes	%	±%
Labour	Keith Holland-Delamere	621		
Conservative	James William Hill	601		
Turnout		1232	32.64	

Riverside (1-member)
Party	Candidate	Votes	%	±%
Conservative	Stephen John Hibbert	491		
Labour	Matthew MCNICHOLAS	375		
Independent	Jean Helena LINEKER	214		
Turnout		1094	30.27	

Rushmills (1-member)
Party	Candidate	Votes	%	±%
Conservative	Daniel George Soan	586		
Labour	Danielle Stone	516		
Turnout		1121	40.19	

Semilong (1-member)
Party	Candidate	Votes	%	±%
Labour	Les Marriott	586		
Conservative	Gregg Lunn	255		
Turnout		849	21.12	

Spencer (1-member)
Party	Candidate	Votes	%	±%
Labour	Gareth Matthew Eales	978		
Conservative	Suresh Patel	331		
Turnout		1319	32.57	

St James (1-member)
Party	Candidate	Votes	%	±%
Labour	Rufia Ashraf	655		
Resident of St James	Graham Neil Croucher	474		
Conservative	Brian Sargeant	401		
Turnout		1542	29.48	

Talavera (2-member)
Party	Candidate	Votes	%	±%
Liberal Democrats	Dennis William George Meredith	842		
Labour	Lorraine Chirisa	751		
Labour	Janice Helen Duffy	718		
Conservative	Taylor Luke Cowley-Coulton	581		
Conservative	Ash Harkara	479		
Turnout		2172	27.18	

Trinity (1-member)
Party	Candidate	Votes	%	±%
Labour	Jane Birch	517		
Conservative	Nahar Begum	258		
Independent	James William Edward Thorpe	170		
Turnout		948	30.03	

Westone (1-member)
Party	Candidate	Votes	%	±%
Conservative	Michael Brown	560		
Labour	Toby Birch	428		
Liberal Democrats	Brian Markham	383		
Turnout		1383	39.17	

== See also ==
- 2021 West Northamptonshire Council election, for the unitary authority held alongside the town council election
