= Shrewsbury Town Council =

Civil parish council in Shropshire, England

Shrewsbury Town Council is the town council of Shrewsbury in Shropshire, established in April 2009 as part of structural changes to local government in England that abolished Shrewsbury and Atcham Borough Council and created in its place the unitary Shropshire Council. Shrewsbury was previously unparished, with the Mayor of Shrewsbury and Atcham acting as the town's mayor. With a population of over 76,000, Shrewsbury is the fourth-most populous parish in England.

The town council provides horticultural services and is responsible for parks, sports pitches, recreation grounds, allotments and highway verges. The council also manages provision of the town market, community facilities, bus shelters, street lighting and public toilets.

The town is subdivided into 17 wards, each of which returns one councillor to sit on the town council. Elections are held every four years, alongside Shropshire Council elections, using first-past-the-post. The wards are mostly coterminous with the Shropshire Council divisions created in 2009. (Note: 15 of the town council wards are coterminous with county electoral divisions; the exception is Bayston Hill, Column and Sutton division which comprises the ward of Column, the ward of Sutton and Reabrook, and the separate parish of Bayston Hill.)

== History ==
Until 2009, Shrewsbury was an unparished area with neither town or parish council. Instead, the mayor of Shrewsbury and Atcham, based in the Guildhall in Dogpole, was also the mayor of the town. However, as part of wider changes to local government in Shropshire, the town was parished on 13 May 2008, with a single parish created covering the entire town and previously unparished area. At the time of creation, Shrewsbury was the second-most populous civil parish in England, though further creations of large town councils mean it is now the fourth. The area of the parish is 3,799 hectares (9,390 acres).

The town council first convened on 1 April 2009 and its chair is the mayor of Shrewsbury. For the interim period before the first elections, the existing county councillors who represented electoral divisions covering Shrewsbury were the town councillors. On 4 June 2009, the first election was held to the town council, with councillors elected from 17 single-member wards coterminous with Shropshire Council electoral divisions.

The political make-up of the town council, as of the 2025 elections, sees the Liberal Democrats as the largest party with 10 seats, Labour with 4, the Green Party with 2 and Reform UK with 1.

== Premises ==
The town council was based at the Guildhall on Frankwell Quay, a facility which had originally been built in 2004 as the headquarters of Shrewsbury and Atcham Borough Council; however the town council moved to Riggs Hall in 2017. Riggs Hall is one of the original buildings on the former site of Shrewsbury School on Castle Gates. Since 2023, the town council have their offices at Livesey House, on St John's Hill and the council itself meets in the Shirehall.

== Mayor of Shrewsbury ==
Prior to 2009, the Mayor of Shrewsbury and Atcham Borough Council acted as Mayor of Shrewsbury. The Mayor is elected annually for a one-year term alongside the Deputy Mayor. By convention the Deputy Mayor becomes Mayor the following year.

Term	Mayor	Ward	Party
2009-10	Alan Townsend	Belle Vue	Labour
2010-11	Kathleen Owen	Meole	Conservative
2011-12	Tony Durnell	Monkmoor	Conservative
2012-13	Keith Roberts	Radbrook	Conservative
2013-14	Jon Tandy	Sutton and Reabrook	Labour
2014-15	Beverley Baker	Bagley	Liberal Democrat
2015-16	Miles Kenny	Underdale	Liberal Democrat
2016-17	Ioan Jones	Harlescott	Labour

== Elections ==
Shrewsbury Town Council
Year	Lab	Lib	Con	Grn	Ref
2009	3	2	12	0	N/A
2010*	4	2	11	0	N/A
2012*	4	3	10	0	N/A
2013	7	5	5	0	N/A
2017	7	3	6	1	N/A
2021	7	6	2	2	0
2025	4	10	0	2	1
The changing political make-up of the town council – * = by-election

Since the formation of the existing council in 2009, the council has comprised 17 wards each returning one councillor. Elections are held every four years coinciding with the unitary Shropshire Council elections.

== See also ==
- Shropshire Council
- Local government in England
