= List of smallest cities in the United Kingdom =

Map of St Davids in Pembrokeshire, Wales, demonstrating the size of the settlement (grey), compared to its wider community boundary. Also indicated are isolated hamlets within the city. City boundaries Built-up area

The table displays the 31 smallest of the cities in the United Kingdom across three measures. Most of these appear in all three of the following categories:

- Area (body): (Note: The area (body) measurement is the size of a localised council area which is designated as a city, if there is one. Council area boundaries are well-defined, and cities are typically awarded the honour via parish or principal governing public bodies. Many in the table are parishes (England) or communities (Wales), except for the City of London (county). Several districts that hold city status are shown as the areas become larger; these are named after their only settlement or largest town in the case of multiple settlements. Cities can also be boroughs, which are an honorific title for districts. In Scotland and Northern Ireland wider council areas can hold the title on behalf of a city urban area much like a charter trust and in Northern Ireland particularly, these mainly have multiple place names in their titles, so the area (body) does not apply in these cases. Some local legal entity types such as communities in Scotland or townlands in Northern Ireland do not at present hold city status.) This default sort ranks the physically smallest 23 local government areas (parish/community, district, county) and if missing, a built-up locality that has city status
- Area (locale): 24 cities with the smallest same-name built-up area (many cities have much countryside and multiple settlements within their boundaries)
- Census population: 27 cities around 100,000 residents and fewer since the 2001 census

Lichfield, Hereford and Salisbury, in addition to being some of the smallest cities in England, are among the most populous civil parishes.

== Smallest overseas British cities ==
The least populous cities on all of British territory are Jamestown in St Helena, Ascension and Tristan da Cunha (pop. 629) and Hamilton in Bermuda (pop. 854).

== List of smallest UK cities ==
City	County/council area (Scotland/Wales)	Area (body/locale)		Body	Area (locale) (Note: The area (locale) reflects the built up area that most closely corresponds to the urban area of the named city settlement, which means for many small cities that portions of their administrative area is rural land.It is used in the statistics instead of the body size where there is no local government entity, e.g. unparished area with city charter trustees, or cities designated by their urban area (Scotland, Northern Ireland). This is a secondary method of determining physical size; relatively fewer cities are explicitly defined in this way, and their urban area can extend beyond the city boundary. London and Westminster are completely surrounded by a much larger built-up area (Greater London) and so any parkland within these is considered part of their urban landscape. Thus Wells is the smallest standalone city, as it is wholly surrounded by countryside)		Locale/ body %	Census population				Country
City	County/council area (Scotland/Wales)	Rank	sq mi (km^{2})	Body	Rank	sq mi (km^{2})	Locale/ body %	Rank (2021)	2021	2011	2001	Country
City of London	City of London	1	1.12 (2.90)	County	3	—	—	3	8,583	7,375	7,185	England
Wells	Somerset	2	2.11 (5.46)	Parish	4	1.35 (3.50)	63.99%	4	11,145	10,536	10,406	England
St Asaph	Denbighshire	3	2.49 (6.45)	Community	2	0.50 (1.29)	20.19%	2	3,485	3,355 (Note: Not a city at time of census)	3,491	Wales
Bangor	Gwynedd	4	2.79 (7.23)	Community	5	1.65 (4.27)	59.20%	5	15,060	16,358	13,725	Wales
Ripon	North Yorkshire	5	3.83 (9.92)	Parish	7	1.97 (5.10)	51.36%	7	16,590	16,702	15,922	England
Armagh	County Armagh	6	—	None	11	3.97 (10.28)	—	6	16,310	14,749	14,590	Northern Ireland
Chichester	West Sussex	7	4.12 (10.67)	Parish	9	3.32 (8.60)	80.77%	11	29,407	26,795	23,731	England
Truro	Cornwall	8	4.15 (10.75)	Parish	8	2.83 (7.33)	68.25%	9	21,046	18,766	17,431	England
Lichfield	Staffordshire	9	5.41 (14.01)	Parish	10	3.35 (8.68)	61.84%	12	32,580	32,219	27,900	England
Newry	County Armagh/Down	10	—	None	16	5.43 (14.06)	—	10	28,530	26,967	27,433	Northern Ireland
Perth	Perth & Kinross	11	—	None	19	6.71 (17.38)	—	14	47,350	46,970	43,450	Scotland
Salisbury	Wiltshire	12	7.14 (18.49)	Parish	12	4.36 (11.29)	61.04%	13	41,552	40,302	39,726	England
Lisburn	County Antrim/Down	13	—	None	20	7.53 (19.50)	—	16	51,447	45,370	71,465	Northern Ireland
Bangor	County Down	14	—	None	21	7.55 (19.55)	—	19	64,596	61,011	58,388	Northern Ireland
Hereford	Herefordshire	15	7.85 (20.33)	Parish	17	6.58 (17.04)	83.82%	17	53,113	58,896	50,154	England
Stirling	Stirling	16	—	None	23	7.91 (20.49)	—	15	49,950	45,750	45,115	Scotland
City of Westminster	Greater London	17	8.29 (21.47)	District	24	—	—	—	204,236	219,396	181,286	England
Inverness	Highland	18	—	None	—	10.28 (26.63)	—	18	63,730	61,235	71,000	Scotland
Carlisle	Cumbria	19	10.38 (26.88) (Note: This was reformed in April 2023, from a district measuring 401.28 sq mi (1,039.31 km2) to a smaller, mainly unparished area covering several district wards)	Trustee	22	7.76 (20.10)	74.75%	26	110,024 (Note: This was reformed in April 2023, from a district measuring 401.28 sq mi (1,039.31 km2) to a smaller, mainly unparished area covering several district wards)	107,524	100,739	England
Dunfermline	Fife	20	—	None	—	10.85 (28.10)	—	20	76,210	68,426	39,320	Scotland
Worcester	Worcestershire	21	12.85 (33.28)	District	—	9.52 (24.66)	74.12%	25	103,872	98,768	93,353	England
Derry	County Londonderry	22	—	None	—	13.10 (33.93)	—	21	85,279	85,016	83,652	Northern Ireland
Lincoln	Lincolnshire	23	13.78 (35.69)	District	—	12.61 (32.66)	91.48%	24	103,813	93,541	85,595	England
St Davids	Pembrokeshire	—	17.88 (46.31)	Community	1	0.23 (0.596)	1.29%	1	1,751	1,841	1,797	Wales
Ely	Cambridgeshire	—	22.86 (59.21)	Parish	6	1.84 (4.77)	8.04%	8	20,574	20,256	15,102	England
City of Bath	Somerset	—	28.68 (74.28) (Note: The city area given is the area of the former borough, in existence until 1996)	Trustee	—	11.07 (28.67)	—	22	97,066	88,859	83,992	England
City of Canterbury	Kent	—	119.25 (308.86)	District	15	5.09 (13.18)	4.27%	—	157,432	151,145	135,278	England
City of Durham	County Durham	—	186.68 (483.50) (Note: This was parished in 2018, but city charter trustees continue to exist, and so hold the charter on behalf of the city area covered by the much wider Durham city district council until 2009. The 2011 population is that of wards covering the same area. The title is not held by the parish council. Size of the parish is 5.56 sq mi (14.40 km^{2}) and its population 20,115 (2011).)	Trustee	14	4.96 (12.85)	—	23	101,372	94,375	87,709	England
Wrexham	Wrexham	—	194.51 (503.78)	District	18	6.70 (17.35)	3.45%	—	135,117	134,884	128,476	Wales
City of Winchester	Hampshire	—	255.20 (660.96)	District	13	4.76 (12.33)	1.86%	27	127,444	116,595	107,222	England
City of Chester	Cheshire	—	448.04 (1,160.42) (Note: The area given is the prior City of Chester district active until 2009. Population of wards in 2001 was 118,210.)	Trustee	—	9.85 (25.51)	—	—	138,873	79,645	77,040	England

== Notes ==
- Statistics in italics have been added for completion of the table. These are in numerical but non-ranking order.
- English cities prefixed 'City of...' are districts so named to distinguish them from a namesake settlement area which does not have city status, with the City of London having additional county status. All of these except London have several communities and suburbs within their boundaries, with most containing large swathes of countryside, extra settlements and sometimes parishes/communities.
