= List of the most populous civil parishes in England =

This is a list of the most populous civil parishes in England. It includes all civil parishes with populations over 30,000, representing less than 1% of all civil parishes but almost 3% of the population.

Lichfield, Hereford and Salisbury are in addition to being some of the most populous civil parishes in England, among the smallest cities.

The first civil parish councils were created in 1894, mostly in rural areas, replacing the duties of local church authorities.

Many large parishes have been created during the 21st century, due in part to new procedures making their creation easier, and also the ongoing creation of large unitary authorities, which has led to the desire to retain a more local tier of government.

In 2020, Northampton became the largest civil parish in England due to local government reorganisation in 2021 which saw it become part of the larger West Northamptonshire unitary authority. In 2026 the parishes of Bournemouth and Poole were formed, the pre 2019 districts of Bournemouth and Poole had a 2015 estimated population of 194,500 and 150,600 however as well as boundary changes the pre 2019 Bournemouth area also has Throop and Holdenhurst and the pre 2019 Poole area also has Broadstone.

Rank	Parish	District	Population	Status	Parish council created	Council
1	Northampton	West Northamptonshire	137,387	Town	2020	Northampton Town Council
2	Sutton Coldfield	Birmingham	96,678	Town	2016	Sutton Coldfield Town Council
3	Weston-super-Mare	North Somerset	82,418	Town	2000	Weston-super-Mare Town Council
4	Shrewsbury	Shropshire	76,782	Town	2009	Shrewsbury Town Council
5	Harrogate	North Yorkshire	71,725	Town	2025	Harrogate Town Council
6	Aylesbury	Buckinghamshire	63,126	Town	2001	Aylesbury Town Council
7	South Swindon	Swindon	62,871	Parish	2017	South Swindon Parish Council
8	Corby	North Northamptonshire	62,347	Parish	2021	Corby Town Council
9	Bracknell	Bracknell Forest	60,422	Town	1955	Bracknell Town Council
10	Kidderminster	Wyre Forest	57,400	Town	2015	Kidderminster Town Council
11	Keighley	Bradford	57,345	Town	2002	Keighley Town Council
12	Kettering Town	North Northamptonshire	57,100	Town	2021	Kettering Town Council
13	Barrow	Westmorland and Furness	55,489	Town	2023	Barrow Town Council
14	Crewe	Cheshire East	55,318	Town	2013	Crewe Town Council
15	Banbury	Cherwell	54,335	Town	2000	Banbury Town Council
16	Weymouth	Dorset	53,427	Town	2019	Weymouth Town Council
17	Hereford	Herefordshire	53,112	City	2000	Hereford City Council
18	Macclesfield	Cheshire East	52,496	Town	2015	Macclesfield Town Council
19	Royal Leamington Spa	Warwick	50,923	Town	2002	Royal Leamington Spa Town Council
20	Lowestoft	East Suffolk	47,879	Town	2017	Lowestoft Town Council
21	Folkestone	Folkestone and Hythe	47,352	Town	2004	Folkestone Town Council
22	Salisbury	Wiltshire	41,820	City	2009	Salisbury City Council
23	Ramsgate	Thanet	41,896	Town	2009	Ramsgate Town Council
24	Grantham	South Kesteven	39,588	Town	2024	Grantham Town Council
25	Farnham	Waverley	39,167	Town	1984	Farnham Town Council
26	Scarborough	North Yorkshire	38,954	Town	2025	Scarborough Town Council
27	Canvey Island	Castle Point	38,941	Town	2007	Canvey Island Town Council
28	Hatfield	Welwyn Hatfield	38,600	Town	1894	Hatfield Town Council
29	Wokingham	Wokingham	38,284	Town	1974	Wokingham Town Council
30	Bishop's Stortford	East Hertfordshire	37,873	Town	1974	Bishop's Stortford Town Council
31	Bury St Edmunds	West Suffolk	37,854	Town	2003	Bury St Edmunds Town Council
32	Elstree and Borehamwood	Hertsmere	37,084	Town	1894	Elstree and Borehamwood Town Council
33	Leighton–Linslade	Central Bedfordshire	37,081	Town	1974	Leighton-Linslade Town Council
34	Andover	Test Valley	36,977	Town	2010	Andover Town Council
35	Morecambe	Lancaster	36,530	Town	2009	Morecambe Town Council
36	Billingham	Stockton-on-Tees	36,424	Town	2007	Billingham Town Council
37	Blyth	Northumberland	36,379	Town	2009	Blyth Town Council
38	Bridlington	East Riding of Yorkshire	36,324	Town	2000	Bridlington Town Council
39	Bridgwater	Somerset	35,625	Town	2003	Bridgwater Town Council
40	Chippenham	Wiltshire	35,155	Town	1984	Chippenham Town Council
41	Dunstable	Central Bedfordshire	35,068	Town	1985	Dunstable Town Council
42	Exmouth	East Devon	34,441	Town	1995	Exmouth Town Council
43	Central Swindon North	Swindon	33,495	Parish	2017	Central Swindon North Parish Council
44	Ecclesfield	Sheffield	32,903	Parish	1894	Ecclesfield Parish Council
45	Earley	Wokingham	32,670	Town	1974	Earley Town Council
46	Abingdon-on-Thames	Vale of White Horse	32,183	Town	1974	Abingdon-on-Thames Town Council
47	Rayleigh	Rochford	31,982	Town	1996	Rayleigh Town Council
48	Morley	Leeds	31,832	Town	2000	Morley Town Council
49	Stanley	County Durham	31,673	Town	2007	Stanley Town Council
50	Trowbridge	Wiltshire	31,392	Town	1974	Trowbridge Town Council
51	Loughton	Epping Forest	31,218	Town	1996	Loughton Town Council
52	Newbury	West Berkshire	31,200	Town	1997	Newbury Town Council
53	Lichfield	Lichfield	31,068	City	1980	Lichfield City Council
54	Winsford	Cheshire West and Chester	31,038	Town	1974	Winsford Town Council
55	Bicester	Cherwell	30,474	Town	1974	Bicester Town Council
