= Shrewsbury Town Council elections =

Elections to the Shrewsbury Town Council in Shropshire, England are conducted every four years, coinciding with the Shropshire Council elections. The Shrewsbury civil parish governed by the council consists of 17 wards each returning one councillor.

Shrewsbury Town Council
Year	Lab	Lib	Con	Grn	Ref
2009	3	2	12	0	N/A
2010*	4	2	11	0	N/A
2012*	4	3	10	0	N/A
2013	7	5	5	0	N/A
2017	7	3	6	1	N/A
2021	7	6	2	2	0
2025	4	10	0	2	1
The changing political make-up of the town council – * = by-election

== Shrewsbury Town Council election 2025 ==
The fifth elections to Shrewsbury Town Council were held on 1 May 2025.

=== Summary ===
Shrewsbury Town Council Election, 2025
Party	Seats	Gains	Losses	Net gain/loss	Seats %	Votes %	Votes	+/−
Liberal Democrats	10	4	0	▲4			8,158	
Labour	4	0	3	▼3			4,350	
Reform	1	1		▲1			4,275	
Green	2	2	0	Steady			2,889	
Conservative	0	0	2	▼2			1,674	
Independent	0	0	0	Steady			436	
Heritage	0	0	0	Steady			12	
Total							21,794	

=== Full Results ===
Abbey
Party	Candidate	Votes	%	±%
Liberal Democrats	James Daniels	862	48.32	
Reform	Stuart Peter Phelps	323	18.11	New
Labour	Luke Alexander Cullen	263	14.74	
Conservative	Matthew Charles Stone	228	12.78	
Green	Aidan Samuel Oliver Brockel	108	6.05	
Majority				
Turnout			39.10	
Liberal Democrats hold		Swing		

Bagley
Party	Candidate	Votes	%	±%
Liberal Democrats	Benedict John Alexander Jephcott	734	50.66	
Reform	David Gerrard Geran	399	27.54	New
Labour	Paul David Hollington	230	15.87	
Green	Naomi Ruth Yates	86	5.94	New
Majority				
Turnout			39.20	
Liberal Democrats gain from Conservative		Swing		

Battlefield
Party	Candidate	Votes	%	±%
Reform	Harry Hancock-Davies	336	32.37	New
Liberal Democrats	Katarzyna Fejfer	281	27.07	
Green	Christopher Paul Davenport	237	22.83	New
Conservative	Rebecca Alice Wall*	127	12.24	
Labour	John Howard Turnbull	57	5.49	
Majority				
Turnout			33.60	
Reform gain from Conservative		Swing		

Belle Vue
Party	Candidate	Votes	%	±%
Labour	Mary Kate Halliday*	827	55.73	
Reform	Norman James Brown	278	18.73	New
Conservative	Alexander George Phillips	144	9.7	
Green	Alexandra Katherine Biggs	118	7.95	
Liberal Democrats	William John Daniel Read	117	7.88	
Majority				
Turnout			44	
Labour hold		Swing		

Bicton Heath (renamed from Bowbrook)
Party	Candidate	Votes	%	±%
Liberal Democrats	Jonathan Tandy	994	73.74	
Green	Giles St John Fancourt Bell	153	11.35	New
Labour	Wynn Davies	201	14.91	
Majority				
Turnout			37.40	
Liberal Democrats hold		Swing		

Castlefields and Ditherington
Party	Candidate	Votes	%	±%
Labour	Alan Neil Moseley*	563	33.91	
	Joe Elliott George Dyas	171	17.7	
Green	Carlos Terol Marrero	120	12.42	
Liberal Democrats	Matthew David Hamilton Clark	112	11.59	
Majority				
Turnout			29.20	
Labour hold		Swing		

Column
Party	Candidate	Votes	%	±%
Labour	Rosemary Lucy Winifred Dartnall*	453	33.91	
Conservative	Freddie John Anderson	335	25.07	
Reform	Maria Joanna Barbara Felton	314	23.5	
Liberal Democrats	Jonathan Dennis Kenneth Moore	163	12.2	
Green	Diane Louise Monether	71	5.31	
Majority				
Turnout			43.10	
Labour hold		Swing		

Copthorne
Party	Candidate	Votes	%	±%
Liberal Democrats	Robert Michael Wilson*	943	55.47	
Reform	Gareth Bowles	292	17.18	
Conservative	Jeffrey John Anderson	249	14.65	
Labour	Harry Taylor	131	7.71	
Green	Christopher James Houlston	85	5	
Majority				
Turnout			43.10	
Liberal Democrats hold		Swing		

Harlescott
Party	Candidate	Votes	%	±%
Liberal Democrats	Rhys Gratton	335	39.79	
Reform	Gwendoline Laura Wellings	282	33.49	New
Labour Co-op	Elizabeth Anne Addams	138	16.39	
Conservative	Stanley Wilkinson	48	5.7	
Green	April Elizabeth Evans	39	4.63	
Majority				
Turnout			26.20	
Liberal Democrats gain from Labour		Swing		

Meole
Party	Candidate	Votes	%	±%
Liberal Democrats	Bernard Bentick*	887	63.27	
Reform	Lee David Gough	315	22.47	
Labour	Edith Caroline Leake	129	9.2	
Green	Peter John Gilbert	71	5.06	
Majority				
Turnout			41.90	
Liberal Democrats hold		Swing		

Monkmoor
Party	Candidate	Votes	%	±%
Liberal Democrats	Slawomir Adam Fejfer	603	50.08	
Reform	Paul Clifford Felton	310	25.75	
Labour	Pamela Ann Moseley*	252	20.93	
Green	Julia Louise Kaldewey Evans	39	3.24	
Majority				
Turnout			36.70	
Liberal Democrats gain from Labour		Swing		

Oteley and Reabrook (renamed from Sutton and Reabrook)
Party	Candidate	Votes	%	±%
Liberal Democrats	Victoria Jane Moore	484	40.98	
Reform	Tobias Charles Cowell	323	27.35	
Labour	Philip John Gillam*	232	19.64	
Conservative	Rebecca Ann Nuttall	105	8.89	
Green	Andrew John Charles Normand	37	3.13	
Majority				
Turnout			34.90	
Liberal Democrats gain from Labour		Swing		

Porthill
Party	Candidate	Votes	%	±%
Green	Julian David Geoffrey Dean*	800	54.05	
Liberal Democrats	Graham James Tate	289	19.53	
	Philip Leslie Bailey	265	17.91	
Labour	Mark Austin Hayward	126	8.51	
Majority				
Turnout			40.20	
Green hold		Swing		

Quarry and Coton Hill
Party	Candidate	Votes	%	±%
Liberal Democrats	Alexander Simon Wagner	623	57.42	
Reform	Anthony Paterson	183	16.87	
Labour	Robert Henry Saunders	128	11.8	
Conservative	Peter Michael Adams	77	7.1	
Green	Bibbs Mavis Christine Tomaszewski	74	6.82	
Majority				
Turnout			32.70	
Liberal Democrats hold		Swing		

Radbrook
Party	Candidate	Votes	%	±%
Green	Emma Daisy Micklewright	754	50.95	
Reform	Michael John Avery	305	20.61	
Conservative	Saiful Hussain Chowdhury	215	14.53	
Liberal Democrats	Richard Paul Murphy	112	7.57	
Labour	Rhiannon Jarman	94	6.35	
Majority				
Turnout			41.70	
Green hold		Swing		

Sundorne
Party	Candidate	Votes	%	±%
Labour	Kevin John Pardy*	356	39.12	
Reform	Amanda Jane Duncan	354	38.9	
Conservative	Jeremy George Nuttall	73	8.02	
Liberal Democrats	Edward Barry Wagner	71	7.8	
Green	Judith Mary Savage	44	4.84	
Heritage	Ian Goddard	12	1.32	
Majority				
Turnout			26.30	
Labour hold		Swing		

Underdale
Party	Candidate	Votes	%	±%
Liberal Democrats	David Vasmer*	548	49.59	
Reform	Martin Edward Leslie Oakley	261	23.62	
Labour	James David Turnbull	170	15.38	
Conservative	Kenneth Michael Vine	73	6.61	
Green	Barry Hutchinson	53	4.8	
Majority				
Turnout			32.60	
Liberal Democrats hold		Swing		

*Incumbent councillor seeking re-election

== Shrewsbury Town Council election 2021 ==
The fourth elections to Shrewsbury Town Council were held on 6 May 2021.

=== Summary ===
Shrewsbury Town Council Election, 2021
Party	Seats	Gains	Losses	Net gain/loss	Seats %	Votes %	Votes	+/−
Labour	7			Steady			7,687	
Conservative	2			▼4			5,440	
Liberal Democrats	6			▲3			6,153	
Green	2			▲1			3,244	
Independent	0			Steady			271	
Total							22,924	

=== Full Results ===
Abbey
Party	Candidate	Votes	%	±%
Liberal Democrats	Mary Davies	642	39.19	
Conservative	Ian Burgess	473	28.88	
Labour	Martyn Harris	391	23.87	
Green	Helem Campbell	132	8.06	
Majority				
Turnout				
Liberal Democrats hold		Swing		

Bagley
Party	Candidate	Votes	%	±%
Conservative	Alexander Phillips*	428	29.58	
Liberal Democrats	Beverly Baker	401	27.71	
Labour	Paul Hollington	347	23.98	
Independent	Peter Day	271	18.73	
Majority				
Turnout				
Conservative hold		Swing		

Battlefield
Party	Candidate	Votes	%	±%
Conservative	Rebecca Wall*	503	53.4	
Labour Co-op	Frances Rickford	299	31.74	
Liberal Democrats	Laura Hoskison	140	14.86	
Majority				
Turnout				
Conservative hold		Swing		

Belle Vue
Party	Candidate	Votes	%	±%
Labour	Kate Halliday*	1006	65.79	
Conservative	Saiful Chowdary	295	19.29	
Green	Sara Mai	147	9.61	
Liberal Democrats	Byron Grainger-Jones	81	5.3	
Majority				
Turnout				
Labour hold		Swing		

Bowbrook
Party	Candidate	Votes	%	±%
Liberal Democrats	Alex Wagner	1039	64.33	New
Conservative	Arlinda Ballcaj	327	20.25	
Labour	Seamus Corrigan	249	15.42	
Majority				
Turnout				
Liberal Democrats gain from Conservative		Swing		

Castlefields and Ditherington
Party	Candidate	Votes	%	±%
Labour	Alan Moseley*	818	76.31	
Green	Peter Gilbert	150	13.99	
Liberal Democrats	Matthew Clark	104	9.7	
Majority				
Turnout				
Labour hold		Swing		

Column
Party	Candidate	Votes	%	±%
Labour	Rosemary Dartnall	594	47.63	
Conservative	James Katz	495	39.7	
Green	April Evans	95	7.62	
Liberal Democrats	Ivana Novotna	63	5.05	
Majority				
Turnout				
Labour hold		Swing		

Copthorne
Party	Candidate	Votes	%	±%
Liberal Democrats	Robert Wilson	984	58.54	
Conservative	Peter Nutting	480	28.55	
Labour	Ian Matthews	217	12.91	
Majority				
Turnout				
Liberal Democrats gain from Conservative		Swing		

Harlescott
Party	Candidate	Votes	%	±%
Labour	Elisabeth Anne Roberts	367	43.95	
Conservative	Jeffrey John Anderson	354	42.4	
Green	Matthew James Galliers	66	7.9	
Liberal Democrats	Artur Fejfer	48	5.75	
Majority				
Turnout				
Labour hold		Swing		

Meole
Party	Candidate	Votes	%	±%
Liberal Democrats	Bernard Bentick	551	36.18	
Conservative	Gwendoline Burgess*	457	30.01	
Labour	Nigel Adams	391	25.67	
Green	Christopher Davenport	124	8.14	
Majority				
Turnout				
Liberal Democrats gain from Conservative		Swing		

Monkmoor
Party	Candidate	Votes	%	±%
Labour	Pamela Moseley*	526	50.67	
Liberal Democrats	Slawomir Fejfer	437	42.1	
Green	Jeremy Brown	43	4.14	
Green	Claire Kirby	32	3.08	
Majority				
Turnout				
Labour hold		Swing		

Porthill
Party	Candidate	Votes	%	±%
Green	Julian Dean*	1153	66.3	
Liberal Democrats	Graham Tate	414	23.81	
Labour	Anwen Davies	172	9.89	
Majority				
Turnout				
Green hold		Swing		

Quarry and Coton Hill
Party	Candidate	Votes	%	±%
Liberal Democrats	Nat Green*	537	41.44	
Conservative	Robin Hooper	342	26.39	
Labour	Paul Forrest	276	21.3	
Green	Huw Peach	141	10.88	
Majority				
Turnout				
Liberal Democrats hold		Swing		

Radbrook
Party	Candidate	Votes	%	±%
Green	Christopher Lemon	1074	53.92	
Conservative	Susan Coleman	647	32.48	
Labour	Kevin Dovastan	271	13.6	
Majority				
Turnout				
Green gain from Conservative		Swing		

Sundorne
Party	Candidate	Votes	%	±%
Labour	Kevin Pardy*	675	84.38	
Green	Gareth Egarr	87	10.88	
Liberal Democrats	Gajendra Naidu	38	4.75	
Majority				
Turnout				
Labour hold		Swing		

Sutton and Reabrook
Party	Candidate	Votes	%	±%
Labour	Phillip Gillam*	688	51.57	
Conservative	Simon Orr	440	32.98	
Green	Diane Monether	129	9.67	
Liberal Democrats	Robert Lea	77	5.77	
Majority				
Turnout				
Labour hold		Swing		

Underdale
Party	Candidate	Votes	%	±%
Liberal Democrats	David Vasmer*	597	49.92	
Labour	Erdogan Uyan	400	33.44	
Conservative	David Morgan	199	16.64	
Majority				
Turnout				
Liberal Democrats hold		Swing		

*Incumbent councillor seeking re-election

== Shrewsbury Town Council election, 2017 ==
The third elections to Shrewsbury Town Council were held on 4 May 2017, coinciding with elections to Shropshire Council.

The Conservatives gained Bagley from the Liberal Democrats while the Greens gained Porthill, its first seat on Shrewsbury Town Council, also from the Liberal Democrats. That left Labour with 7 seats, the Conservatives with 6, the Liberal Democrats with 3 and the Green Party with 1.

=== Summary ===
Shrewsbury Town Council election, 2017
Party	Seats	Gains	Losses	Net gain/loss	Seats %	Votes %	Votes	+/−
Labour	7	0	0	Steady			6,264	
Conservative	6	1	0	▲1			7,553	
Liberal Democrats	3	0	2	▼2			3,919	
Green	1	1	0	▲1			1,603	
UKIP	0	0	0	Steady			387	
Total							19,726	

All wards are single seat.

Abbey
Party	Candidate	Votes	%	±%
Liberal Democrats	Hannah Fraser*	814	57.2	
Conservative	Georgina Alison Boulger	324	22.8	
Labour	Maurice McGrath	222	15.6	
UKIP	John Kinsey Price	63	4.4	
Majority		490		
Turnout		1423		
Liberal Democrats hold		Swing		

Bagley
Party	Candidate	Votes	%	±%
Conservative	Alexander George Phillips	498	38.9	
Liberal Democrats	Beverley Baker*	417	32.6	
Labour	Victoria Tranter	364	28.5	
Majority		81		
Turnout		1279		
Conservative gain from Liberal Democrats		Swing		

Battlefield
Party	Candidate	Votes	%	±%
Conservative	Rebecca Wall	462	56.3	
Labour	Gianluca Cerritelli	288	35.1	
Green	Chris Davenport	71	8.7	
Majority				
Turnout		821		
Conservative hold		Swing		

Belle Vue
Party	Candidate	Votes	%	±%
Labour	Harry Taylor	640	42.9	
Liberal Democrats	Daniel Adam Clark	430	28.8	
Conservative	Simon James Wray	344	23.0	
Green	April Elizabeth Evans	79	5.29	
Majority				
Turnout		1493		
Labour hold		Swing		

Bowbrook
Party	Candidate	Votes	%	±%
Conservative	Peter Adams*	723	72.4	
Green	Peter John Gilbert	276	27.6	
Majority		447		
Turnout		999		
Conservative hold		Swing		

Castlefields and Ditherington
Party	Candidate	Votes	%	±%
Labour	Alan Mosley*	906	78.7	
Conservative	Robert Osborne	184	16.0	
UKIP	Sylvia Loosley	61	5.3	
Majority		722		
Turnout		1151		
Labour hold		Swing		

Column
Party	Candidate	Votes	%	±%
Labour	Jane Mackenzie*	566	51.2	
Conservative	Janine Hayter	465	42.1	
UKIP	Frank James Henry Burgess	74	6.7	
Majority		101		
Turnout		1105		
Labour hold		Swing		

Copthorne
Party	Candidate	Votes	%	±%
Conservative	Peter Nutting*	768	62.6	
Liberal Democrats	Robert Lea	293	23.9	
Green	Gareth Stephen Egarr	165	13.5	
Majority		475		
Turnout		1226		
Conservative hold		Swing		

Harlescott
Party	Candidate	Votes	%	±%
Labour	Ioan Jones	561	57.7	
Conservative	Martin Richard Croll	319	32.8	
UKIP	Marino Bernardo Pacini	92	9.5	
Majority		242		
Turnout		972		
Labour hold		Swing		

Meole
Party	Candidate	Votes	%	±%
Conservative	Nicholas Laurens	692	54.2	
Labour	Rod Turner	340	26.6	
Liberal Democrats	Slawomir Adam Fejfer	152	11.9	
Green	Thomas Hayek	59	4.6	
UKIP	Edward Arthur Higginbottom	35	2.7	
Majority		352		
Turnout		1278		
Conservative hold		Swing		

Monkmoor
Party	Candidate	Votes	%	±%
Labour	Pam Moseley*	703	72.3	
Conservative	Valerie Lingen-Jones	269	27.7	
Majority		434		
Turnout		972		
Labour hold		Swing		

Porthill
Party	Candidate	Votes	%	±%
Green	Julian Dean	701	44.3	
Conservative	Judith McCoy	473	29.9	
Liberal Democrats	David Craddock	408	25.8	
Majority		228		
Turnout		1582		
Green gain from Liberal Democrats		Swing		

Quarry and Coton Hill
Party	Candidate	Votes	%	±%
Liberal Democrats	Nat Green	730	66.7	
Conservative	Arlinda Ballcaj	364	33.3	
Majority		366		
Turnout		1094		
Liberal Democrats hold		Swing		

Radbrook
Party	Candidate	Votes	%	±%
Conservative	Keith Roberts*	787	57.0	
Liberal Democrats	Ian Edward Cartwright	342	24.8	
Green	John Patrick Newnham	190	13.8	
UKIP	Ray Graham	62	4.5	
Majority		445		
Turnout		1381		
Conservative hold		Swing		

Sundorne
Party	Candidate	Votes	%	±%
Labour	Kevin Pardy	628	76.0	
Conservative	Bunty Cross	198	24.0	
Majority		530		
Turnout		826		
Labour hold		Swing		

Sutton and Reabrook
Party	Candidate	Votes	%	±%
Labour	Philip Gillam	789	64.5	
Conservative	Garry David Burchett	426	35.1	
Majority		363		
Turnout		1215		
Labour hold		Swing		

Underdale
Party	Candidate	Votes	%	±%
Liberal Democrats	David Vasmer	360	39.1	
Labour	Peter Liebich	257	27.9	
Conservative	Ken Vine	257	27.9	
Green	Charlie Bell	62	6.7	
Majority		103		
Turnout		929		
Liberal Democrats hold		Swing		

*Incumbent councillor seeking re-election

== Shrewsbury Town Council election, 2013 ==
The second elections to Shrewsbury Town Council were held on 3 May 2013, coinciding with elections to Shropshire Council.

Labour gained Column, Monkmoor and Sundorne from the Conservatives while the Liberal Democrats gained Bagley and Quarry and Coton Hill. The composition of the town council was subsequently 7 for Labour, 5 for the Conservatives and 5 for the Liberal Democrats. With the Conservatives losing overall control, Labour and the Liberal Democrats took control of the control.

Shrewsbury Town Council election, 2013
Party	Seats	Gains	Losses	Net gain/loss	Seats %	Votes %	Votes	+/−
Labour	7	3	0	▲3			8,003	
Conservative	5	0	5	▼5			6,550	
Liberal Democrats	5	2	0	▲2			3,183	
Green	0	0	0	Steady			288	
Total							18,044	

Abbey
Party	Candidate	Votes	%	±%
Liberal Democrats	Hannah Fraser*	744	58.1	
Conservative	Maria Felton	283	22.1	
Labour	Bill Morris	158	12.3	
Green	Sheila Brown	96	7.5	
Majority		461		
Turnout		1,281	42.87	
Liberal Democrats hold		Swing		

Bagley
Party	Candidate	Votes	%	±%
Liberal Democrats	Beverley Baker	374	35.02	
Conservative	Dean Carroll	347	32.49	
Labour Co-op	Ashley Vaughan-Evans	347	32.49	
Majority		27		
Turnout		1,068	30.29	
Liberal Democrats gain from Conservative		Swing		

Battlefield
Party	Candidate	Votes	%	±%
Conservative	Malcolm Price	385	62.6	
Labour Co-op	Connor Jones	230	37.4	
Majority		155		
Turnout		615	21.44	
Conservative hold		Swing		

Belle Vue
Party	Candidate	Votes	%	±%
Labour	Alan Townsend*	928	76.57	
Conservative	Valerie Jones	284	23.43	
Majority		644		
Turnout		1,212	35.77	
Labour hold		Swing		

Bowbrook
Party	Candidate	Votes	%	±%
Conservative	Peter Adams*	608	65.8	
Labour	Rebecca Wall	316	34.2	
Majority		492		
Turnout		924	31.45	
Conservative hold		Swing		

Castlefields and Ditherington
Party	Candidate	Votes	%	±%
Labour	Alan Mosley*	928	85.85	
Conservative	Jennifer Hodges	110	10.18	
Liberal Democrats	Janine Clarke	43	3.98	
Majority		818		
Turnout		1,081	31.09	
Labour hold		Swing		

Column
Party	Candidate	Votes	%	±%
Labour	Jane Mackenzie	600	52.63	
Conservative	Jacqueline Brennand*	540		
Majority		60		
Turnout		1,140	42.17	
Labour gain from Conservative		Swing		

Copthorne
Party	Candidate	Votes	%	±%
Conservative	Peter Nutting*	697	62.12	
Labour	Mark Jones	283	25.22	
Liberal Democrats	Trudy Paula Smith	142	12.66	
Majority		414		
Turnout		1,122	36.26	
Conservative hold		Swing		

Harlescott
Party	Candidate	Votes	%	±%
Labour	Ioan Jones*	550	64.25	
Conservative	Philip Sandford	306	35.75	
Majority		246		
Turnout		856	25.59	
Labour hold		Swing		

Meole
Party	Candidate	Votes	%	±%
Conservative	Kath Owen*	688	55.04	
Labour Co-op	David French	467	37.36	
Liberal Democrats	Margaret Hamer	95	7.6	
Majority		221		
Turnout		1,250	39.69	
Conservative hold		Swing		

Monkmoor
Party	Candidate	Votes	%	±%
Labour	Pam Moseley	660	62.44	
Conservative	Tony Durnell*	319	30.18	
Liberal Democrats	David Grant Pennington	78	7.38	
Majority		341		
Turnout		1,057	31.30	
Labour gain from Conservative		Swing		

Porthill
Party	Candidate	Votes	%	±%
Liberal Democrats	Anne Chebsey*	529	42.49	
Conservative	Saiful Chowdhury	385	30.92	
Labour	Amy Liebich	197	15.82	
Green	James Alan Whittaker	134	10.76	
Majority		144		
Turnout		1,245	37.35	
Liberal Democrats hold		Swing		

Quarry and Coton Hill
Party	Candidate	Votes	%	±%
Liberal Democrats	Andrew Bannerman	475	49.89	
Conservative	Ashley Davies	286	30.04	
Labour Co-op	John Olaf Lewis	191	20.06	
Majority		199		
Turnout		952	30.61	
Liberal Democrats gain from Conservative		Swing		

Radbrook
Party	Candidate	Votes	%	±%
Conservative	Keith Roberts*	735	59.27	
Labour	Jeanette Petherbridge	505	40.73	
Majority		230		
Turnout		1,240	37.95	
Conservative hold		Swing		

Sundorne
Party	Candidate	Votes	%	±%
Labour	Kevin Pardy	585	72.49	
Conservative	Karen Burgoyne	227	27.51	
Majority		348		
Turnout		807	26.14	
Labour gain from Conservative		Swing		

Sutton and Reabrook
Party	Candidate	Votes	%	±%
Labour	Jon Tandy*	899	77.1	
Conservative	Timothy Milsom	267	22.9	
Majority		632		
Turnout		1,166	40.77	
Labour hold		Swing		

Underdale
Party	Candidate	Votes	%	±%
Liberal Democrats	Miles Kenny*	703	68.72	
Labour Co-op	Susan Batchelor	159	15.54	
Conservative	Robert Osborne	83	8.11	
Green	Ivor Yeomans	78	7.62	
Majority		544		
Turnout		1,023	32.41	
Liberal Democrats hold		Swing		

*Incumbent councillor seeking re election

== Shrewsbury Town Council election, 2009 ==
The first elections to Shrewsbury Town Council were held on 4 June 2009, coinciding with elections to Shropshire Council and the European Parliament.

The Conservatives won 12 seats (4 of which were uncontested), Labour won 3 and the Liberal Democrats won 2.

Shrewsbury Town Council election, 2009
Party	Seats	Gains	Losses	Net gain/loss	Seats %	Votes %	Votes	+/−
Conservative	12			▲12			7,659	
Labour	3			▲3			6,264	
Liberal Democrats	2			▲2			1,841	
Albion Party	0			Steady			288	
Total							15,542	

Abbey
Party	Candidate	Votes	%	±%
Conservative		797		
Labour		445		
Majority		352		
Turnout				
Conservative win (new seat)				

Bagley
Party	Candidate	Votes	%	±%
Conservative				
Conservative win (new seat)				

The Bagley ward was uncontested in 2009, resulting in the Conservative candidate being elected unopposed.

Battlefield
Party	Candidate	Votes	%	±%
Conservative		601		
Labour		229		
Majority		372		
Turnout				
Conservative win (new seat)				

Belle Vue
Party	Candidate	Votes	%	±%
Labour	Alan Townsend	929		
Conservative		678		
Majority		249		
Turnout				
Labour win (new seat)				

Bowbrook
Party	Candidate	Votes	%	±%
Conservative	Peter Adams	861		
Labour	Charles Wilson	268		
Majority		593		
Turnout			50.96	
Conservative win (new seat)				

Castlefields and Ditherington
Party	Candidate	Votes	%	±%
Labour	Alan Mosley	857		
Conservative	Deborah Scollan	367		
Majority		490		
Turnout			41.42	
Labour win (new seat)				

Column
Party	Candidate	Votes	%	±%
Conservative	Jacqueline Brennand	850		
Labour	Liz Parsons	523		
Majority		327		
Turnout			62.74	
Conservative win (new seat)				

Copthorne
Party	Candidate	Votes	%	±%
Conservative	Peter Nutting			
Conservative win (new seat)				

The Copthorne ward was uncontested in 2009, resulting in the Conservative candidate being elected unopposed.

Harlescott
Party	Candidate	Votes	%	±%
Conservative	Susan Taggart	557	52.3	
Labour	Ioan Jones	509	47.7	
Majority		48	4.5	
Turnout			33.82	
Conservative win (new seat)				

Meole
Party	Candidate	Votes	%	±%
Conservative	Kath Owen			
Conservative win (new seat)				

The Meole ward was uncontested in 2009, resulting in the Conservative candidate being elected unopposed.

Monkmoor
Party	Candidate	Votes	%	±%
Conservative	Tony Durnell	571		
Labour	Pam Moseley	570		
Majority		1		
Turnout			35.54	
Conservative win (new seat)				

Porthill
Party	Candidate	Votes	%	±%
Liberal Democrats	Anne Chebsey	868		
Conservative	Judith Williams	655		
Majority		213		
Turnout			48.27	
Liberal Democrats win (new seat)				

Quarry and Coton Hill
Party	Candidate	Votes	%	±%
Conservative	Andrew Wagner	590		
Albion Party	James Grimshaw Gollins	288		
Majority		302		
Turnout			37.77	
Conservative win (new seat)				

Radbrook
Party	Candidate	Votes	%	±%
Conservative	Keith Roberts			
Conservative win (new seat)				

The Radbrook ward was uncontested in 2009, resulting in the Conservative candidate being elected unopposed.

Sundorne
Party	Candidate	Votes	%	±%
Conservative	Dean Carroll	538		
Labour	Daniel Moore	392		
Majority		146		
Turnout			32.72	
Conservative win (new seat)				

Sutton and Reabrook
Party	Candidate	Votes	%	±%
Labour	Jon Tandy	897		
Conservative	Mark Jones	454		
Majority		443		
Turnout			49.87	
Labour win (new seat)				

Underdale
Party	Candidate	Votes	%	±%
Liberal Democrats	Miles Kenny	973		
Conservative	David John Morgan	140		
Labour	Robert Allum	135		
Majority		833		
Turnout			42.93	
Liberal Democrats win (new seat)				

== By-elections ==
Meole, 15 August 2019
Party	Candidate	Votes	%	±%
Conservative	Gwendoline Burgess	428		
Liberal Democrats	Adam Fejfer	299		
Labour	Darrell Morris	277		
Green	Emma Bullard	120		
Independent	Noah Hoskins	43		
Majority				
Turnout		1173	36.76	
Conservative hold		Swing		

Belle Vue, 25 April 2019
Party	Candidate	Votes	%	±%
Labour	Mary Kate Halliday	612		
Liberal Democrats	James McLeod	406		
Conservative	Ross Christopher George	140		
Green	Dave Latham	60		
UKIP	Bob Oakley	51		
Majority				
Turnout		1278	39.01	
Labour hold		Swing		

Abbey, 1 March 2012
Party	Candidate	Votes	%	±%
Liberal Democrats	Hannah Fraser	546	45.0	
Conservative	Peter John Wright	544	44.8	−19.4
Green	John Robert Brown	124	10.2	
Majority		2	0.2	
Turnout		1,233	41.3	
Liberal Democrats gain from Conservative		Swing		

Harlescott, 24 June 2010
Party	Candidate	Votes	%	±%
Labour	Ioan Jones	431	47.1	−0.6
Conservative	Philip Sandford	322	35.2	−17.1
Liberal Democrats	Sharon Carrington	95	10.4	
BNP	Karl Foulkes	57	6.2	
Socialist Alternative	Jake Moore	11	1.2	
Majority		109	11.9	
Turnout		919	26.0	
Labour gain from Conservative		Swing	8.9	
