= 2025 Northampton Town Council election =

Local election in England

- May 1, 2025

All 25 seats on Northampton Town Council 13 seats needed for a majority
	First party	Second party	Third party
Party	Labour	Conservative	Independent
Seats won	16	8	1
Seat change	-1	+1	+1
	Fourth party
Party	Liberal Democrats
Seats won	0
Seat change	-1

The 2025 Northampton Town Council election was held on 1 May 2025 to elect councillors to Northampton Town Council. This was the second election of Northampton Town Council having the same number of seats (25) but across only 13 wards a decrease from the previous 21.

== Results by ward ==
=== Abington and Phippsville Ward (2 Seats) ===
Party	Candidate	Votes	%
Labour	Katie Evans	1233	31
Labour	Clive Millman	1029	26
Conservative	Sian Bateman	619	16
Conservative	Mike O'Connor	588	15
Liberal Democrats	James Robert Tarry	480	12
Turnout		3949	26

=== Billing Aquadrome Ward ===
Party	Candidate	Votes	%
Conservative	Naz Islam	86	58
Labour	Janice Helen Duffy	62	42
Turnout		148	20

=== Blackthorn & Rectory Farm Ward (2 Seats) ===
Party	Candidate	Votes	%
Conservative	Taylor Luke Cowley-Coulton	811	28
Labour	Keith Holland-Delamere	734	25
Conservative	Peter Spink	711	24
Labour	Andrea Cos	681	23
Turnout		2937	25

=== Briar Hill Ward ===
Party	Candidate	Votes	%
Conservative	Ray Connolly	419	62
Labour	Amanda Tandoh	255	38
Turnout		674	24

=== Castle Ward (3 Seats) ===
Party	Candidate	Votes	%
Labour	Gary Campbell	1119	21
Labour	Fartun Ali Ismail	1039	19
Labour	Enam Haque	1028	19
Conservative	Anna King	647	12
Conservative	Carole Thurlow	537	10
Independent	Connor Alan Salter	531	10
Conservative	Roger John Thurlow	497	9
Turnout		5398	18

=== Dallington Spencer Ward (3 Seats) ===
Party	Candidate	Votes	%
Labour	Rufia Ashraf	1286	20
Labour	Charlene Cranstoun	1137	18
Labour	Ben Churchus	1112	18
Conservative	Luke Thomas	780	12
Conservative	Glen Hughes	771	12
Heritage Party	Kim Elizabeth Fuller	664	11
Conservative	Shade Ibitomisin	573	9
Turnout		6323	23

=== Headlands Ward (4 Seats) ===
Party	Candidate	Votes	%
Conservative	Penny Flavell	1339	11
Conservative	Adam Smith	1329	11
Labour	Koulla Jolley	1234	10
Labour	Turon Miah	1212	10
Conservative	Jamie Lane	1158	10
Labour	Elona Latifi	1097	9
Labour	Tom Prophet	1062	9
Conservative	Mobola Bakare	1051	9
Independent	Paul Joyce	942	8
Independent	Mia Joyce	863	7
Liberal Democrats	David Woodbridge	806	7
Turnout		12093	30

=== Kingsley and Semilong Ward (2 Seats) ===
Party	Candidate	Votes	%
Labour	Farzana Aldridge	848	29
Labour	Les Marriott	758	26
Conservative	Lewis Betty	679	24
Conservative	Lori Gale-Rumens	596	21
Turnout		2881	21

=== Moulton Leys Ward ===
Party	Candidate	Votes	%
Independent	Sylvie Orritt	336	47
Conservative	Karl Alan Neville	267	37
Labour	Ersan Karaoglan	119	16
Turnout		722	41

=== Parklands Ward ===
Party	Candidate	Votes	%
Conservative	Mike Hallam	994	79
Labour	Syed Mamun Ali	271	21
Turnout		1265	36

=== Queens Park Ward ===
Party	Candidate	Votes	%
Labour	Jane Linda Birch	350	66
Conservative	Shannon Hallam	180	34
Turnout		530	25

=== Talavera Ward (2 Seats) ===
Party	Candidate	Votes	%
Labour	Ifeoluwa Adeniran	654	24
Labour	Matthew McNicholas	648	24
Conservative	Monica Kelly	635	23
Conservative	Marianna Smith	556	20
Independent	Clement Mzipase Chunga	223	8
Turnout		2716	22

=== Weston Favell and Abington Vale Ward (2 Seats) ===
Party	Candidate	Votes	%
Conservative	Andy Kilbride	1429	28
Conservative	Stephen Hibbert	1413	28
Labour	Clare Robertson-Mariott	952	19
Labour	Jamal Alwahabi	800	16
Liberal Democrats	Alastair Stuart Thomson	540	11
Turnout		5134	37

== Changes 2025-2029 ==
Councillor	Party Before	Party After	Month / Year	Ward
Cllr. Farzana Aldridge	Labour	Liberal Democrats	November 2025	Kingsley & Semilong
