= Platinum Jubilee Civic Honours =

2022 civic honours in the United Kingdom

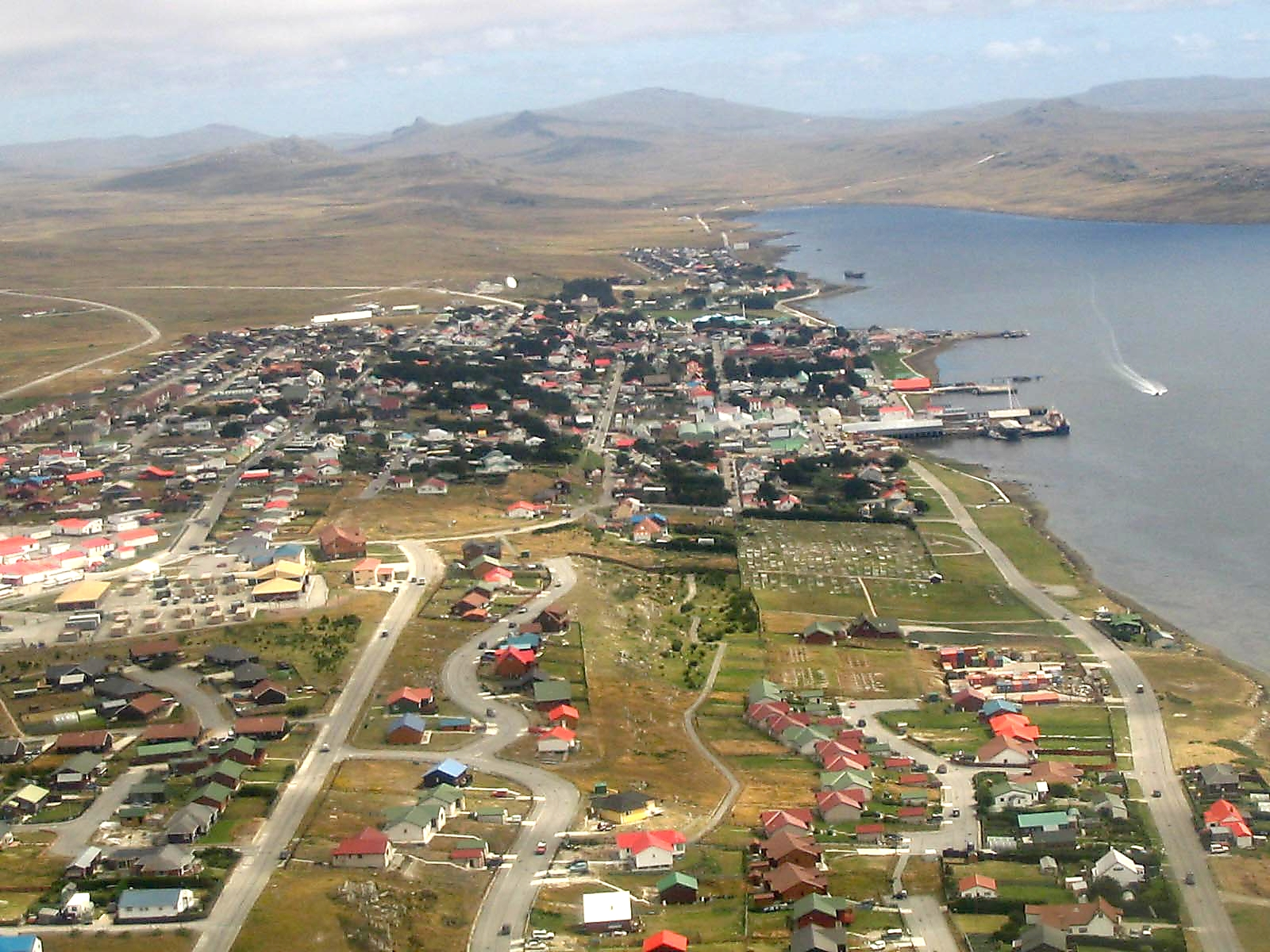
Stanley, Falkland Islands was one of the winners of the 2022 Platinum Jubilee Civic Honours.

As part of the Platinum Jubilee, Queen Elizabeth II awarded a number of civic honours, most notably the creation of new cities in a competition. Another competition for lord mayor or lord provost status was held.

It was announced on 8 June 2021 by Lord True. It was organised by the Department for Digital, Culture, Media and Sport and led by Secretary of State Oliver Dowden. The winners were announced on 20 May 2022, with the eight towns announced to be awarded city status being Bangor (Northern Ireland), Colchester, Doncaster, Douglas (Isle of Man), Dunfermline, Milton Keynes, Stanley (Falkland Islands), and Wrexham. Southampton won the lord mayor title.

== Background ==
City status in the United Kingdom is purely honorary – it confers no special rights or privileges, beyond the entitlement to call the settlement a city. Nevertheless many local authorities seek to become cities, for the additional prestige and tourism it generates. Since the 19th century, the elevation of a town (or borough) to city status has been used by the monarch to mark significant occasions: in 1897, on Queen Victoria's Diamond Jubilee, Bradford, Kingston upon Hull, and Nottingham were granted city status. The first awarding of city status by Queen Elizabeth II was Southampton in 1964, followed by Swansea in 1969. For the Silver Jubilee of 1977, Derby was elevated to city status, and in 1992, Sunderland was awarded city status for her Ruby Jubilee.

Similar city status awards were presented for the Millennium in 2000 (Brighton and Hove, Inverness, Wolverhampton) and for the Golden Jubilee in 2002 (Preston, Newport, Stirling, Lisburn, and Newry).

For the Diamond Jubilee in 2012, 26 towns applied to become cities: Bolton, Bournemouth, Chelmsford, Colchester, Coleraine, Corby, Craigavon, Croydon, Doncaster, Dorchester, Dudley, Dumfries, Gateshead, Goole, Luton, Medway, Middlesbrough, Milton Keynes, Perth, Reading, Southend, St Asaph, St Austell, Stockport, Tower Hamlets and Wrexham. However, the town of Dumfries was later excluded from the process because the application had not been submitted by the local authority. Chelmsford, Perth and St. Asaph were subsequently chosen for city status.

== Process ==
On 8 June 2021, the government announced a new competition for city status for towns across the United Kingdom, crown dependencies and overseas territories, to mark the Platinum Jubilee of Elizabeth II. Southend-on-Sea intended to apply, however after local MP David Amess was murdered in October 2021, the Queen agreed to confer city status on Southend; Amess had campaigned for twenty years to make Southend a city. On 1 March 2022, Charles, Prince of Wales presented the letters patent on behalf of the Queen, in the council chamber at Southend Civic Centre, officially granting city status to the town.

The deadline for bids to the Platinum Jubilee competitions for becoming a city was 8 December 2021. For the first time in the city status process, towns located on Crown Dependencies and British Overseas Territories were eligible to apply. This attracted bids from the Isle of Man, the Cayman Islands, the Falkland Islands and Gibraltar. The winners were announced on 20 May 2022.

Although Gibraltar's bid was refused, when researchers looked through the National Archives, they found that it had already been recognised as a city by Queen Victoria in 1842.

== Applicants for city status ==
Thirty-nine towns and villages (including one county) across the United Kingdom, its overseas territories and crown dependencies participated in the competition. A unique entry was South Ayrshire which entered a countywide bid.

On 20 May 2022, the eight winners of the civic honours were announced. The locations were in the four constituent countries of the UK, the Isle of Man and the Falkland Islands (an Overseas Territory).

The successful applicants will, upon receipt of letters patent, become cities. The settlements that applied were:

| Settlement | Country | Notes | Status |
|---|---|---|---|
| Alcester | England | | No |
| Ballymena | Northern Ireland | | No |
| Bangor | Northern Ireland | | Yes |
| Blackburn | England | | No |
| Bolsover | England | | No |
| Boston | England | | No |
| Bournemouth | England | | No |
| Coleraine | Northern Ireland | | No |
| Colchester | England | | Yes |
| Crawley | England | | No |
| Crewe | England | | No |
| Doncaster | England | | Yes |
| Dorchester | England | | No |
| Douglas | Isle of Man | | Yes |
| Dudley | England | | No |
| Dumfries | Scotland | | No |
| Dunfermline | Scotland | | Yes |
| Elgin | Scotland | | No |
| George Town | Cayman Islands | | No |
| Gibraltar | Gibraltar | | No (Note: Although Gibraltar's bid was refused, when researchers looked through the National Archives, they found that it had already been recognised as a city by Queen Victoria in 1842.) |
| Goole | England | | No |
| Greenock | Scotland | | No |
| Guildford | England | | No |
| Livingston | Scotland | | No |
| Marazion | England | | No |
| Medway | England | | No |
| Middlesbrough | England | | No |
| Milton Keynes | England | | Yes |
| Newport and Carisbrooke | England | | No |
| Northampton | England | | No |
| Oban | Scotland | | No |
| Reading | England | | No |
| Peel | Isle of Man | | No |
| St Andrews | Scotland | | No |
| Stanley | Falkland Islands | | Yes |
| Warrington | England | | No |
| Warwick | England | | No |
| Wrexham | Wales | | Yes |
