= Northampton Town Council =

Parish council in Northampton, England

- Coat of Arms of Northampton

Type
- Type: Parish council

History
- Founded: 1 April 2020; 6 years ago (became full functioning a year later)
- Preceded by: Northampton Borough Council

Leadership
- Mayor: Jane Birch

Structure
- Seats: 24 councillors
- Political groups: Labour Party: 14 seats Conservative Party: 8 seats Liberal Democrats: 1 seats Independent: 1 seat

Elections
- Last election: 1 May 2025
- Next election: 3 May 2029

Meeting place
- Northampton Guildhall

Website
- www.northamptontowncouncil.gov.uk

Northampton Town Council is the parish council covering the civil parish of Northampton, England. The council is one of the largest parish level authority in England by population served. The council has its headquarters at Northampton Guildhall.

== History ==
The council was created on 1 April 2020, but did not become fully functional until a year later. It was created to eliminate the need for charter trustees and to ensure Northampton had a representative body, following the abolition of the former Northampton Borough Council, which was merged into the larger unitary authority West Northamptonshire Council, following local government changes in Northamptonshire. Unlike the former borough council, the town council does not cover the entire Northampton urban area, as several smaller parish councils cover several of the town's suburbs. The town council covers an area with around 130,000 people, out of the roughly 225,000 people in Northampton as a whole.

The historic coat of arms from the former borough council were transferred to the new town council.

The parish was the largest by population when formed in 2020. In 2026 the parishes of Bournemouth and Poole were formed, the pre 2019 districts of Bournemouth and Poole had a 2015 estimated population of 194,500 and 150,600 however as well as boundary changes the pre 2019 Bournemouth area also has Throop and Holdenhurst and the pre 2019 Poole area also has Broadstone.

== Responsibilities ==
The council initially took responsibility for cemeteries, allotments and the mayoralty, and also the running of civic events like festivals, Remembrance Sunday and Armed Forces Day. In 2021 it launched two schemes for distributing grants to local community groups and charities, from an annual budget of £125,000. In 2022 it launched an additional grant scheme with a budget of £50,000, for environmental projects to help address climate change.

== Political control ==
At the first elections to the council on 7 May 2021, the Labour Party took control, winning 17 seats. The Conservative Party won seven, and the Liberal Democrats won one seat.
