= Bracknell Town Council =

Parish council of Bracknell, England

Type
- Type: Parish council

Leadership
- Leader: Graham Firth, Labour
- Mayor: Ellen Mac Hale, Labour
- Town Clerk: Jackie Burgess

Structure
- Seats: 28
- Political groups: Labour (25) Independent (2) Reform UK (1)

Elections
- Voting system: First past the post
- Last election: 4 May 2023
- Next election: 6 May 2027

Meeting place
- Brooke House

Website
- www.bracknelltowncouncil.gov.uk

Bracknell Town Council is the parish council covering the town of Bracknell in Berkshire, England. Established in 1955 as Bracknell Parish Council, it was renamed in April 1974. With a population of over 60,000 as of the 2021 census, the council covers one of the most populous civil parishes in the country.

Unlike many parish councils, which are dominated by independents, the council has been dominated by political parties since its first election in March 1955, and has alternated between Conservative and Labour control.

== Election results ==
Composition of the council
Year	Conservative	Labour	Liberal Democrats (Note: Includes totals for the predecessors of the Liberal Democrats, the Liberal Party and SDP (both of which participated in the Alliance).)	Independents & Others	Council control after election
1955	10	5	0	0	Conservative
1976	15	9	0	0	Conservative
1979	11	14	0	0	Labour
1983	24	1	0	0	Conservative
1987	25	0	0	0	Conservative
1991	15	10	0	0	Conservative
1995	0	25	0	0	Labour
2007	17	6	0	0	Conservative
2011	25	2	0	0	Conservative
2015	25	2	0	0	Conservative
2019	22	4	1	0	Conservative
2023	0	28	0	0	Labour

== Leaders ==
Councillor	Party	From	To
Mary Temperton	Labour	1981	1983
Isabel Mattick	Conservative	1983	
Mary Temperton	Labour	1995	2000
Chris Turrell	Conservative	2004	2011
Chris Turrell	Conservative	2012	May 2023
Graham Firth	Labour	May 2023	
