= Weston Favell Shopping Centre =

Shopping center in Northampton, England

Coordinates: 52.2372°N 0.896°W

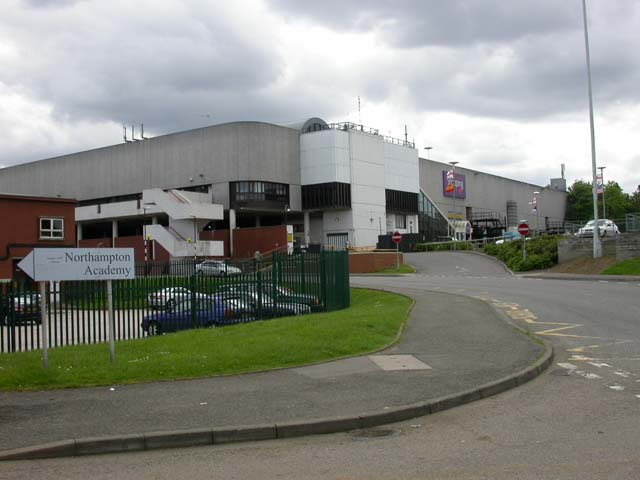
Weston Favell Shopping Centre

Weston Favell Shopping Centre sits on the outskirts of Northampton, in the East Midlands region of England and comprises 330,000 sq ft of retail space with 68 units across 2 levels. The scheme is anchored by Tesco which is one of the Top 10 Tesco Extra format stores in the UK in terms of size. Weston Favell shopping centre also has a selection of multinational retailers including Wilko, Boots, WHSmith and Costa Coffee, as well as a unique selection of independent retailers and service providers. The centre, which opened in 1974, is located close to many other public facilities including Lings Forum Leisure Centre, a doctors surgery, Northampton Academy, two churches and a police station. There is also a small retail park at the rear of the centre.

== Stores ==
The centre's main attraction is the large Tesco Extra store which covers most of the first floor. Aside from that the centre has many shops, banks and food outlets, a full list can be found on their website.

== Refurbishment ==
Plans were released in October 2014 to give the centre a £4 million refurbishment to mark the centres 40th anniversary. The last refurbishment to the centre took place in 2002 when an extension was added to the south of the centre.
