= Lings Forum =

Leisure centre in Northampton, England

Coordinates: 52.256°N 0.835°W

Lings Forum is a leisure centre located in the suburbs of Northampton, England. It is annexed to Weston Favell Shopping Centre and Northampton Academy. The forum has a gym, swimming-pool, sporting arena and a one screen cinema.
