= Northampton =

County town of Northamptonshire, England

Coordinates: 52°13′49″N 0°53′38″W

- Town and civil parish
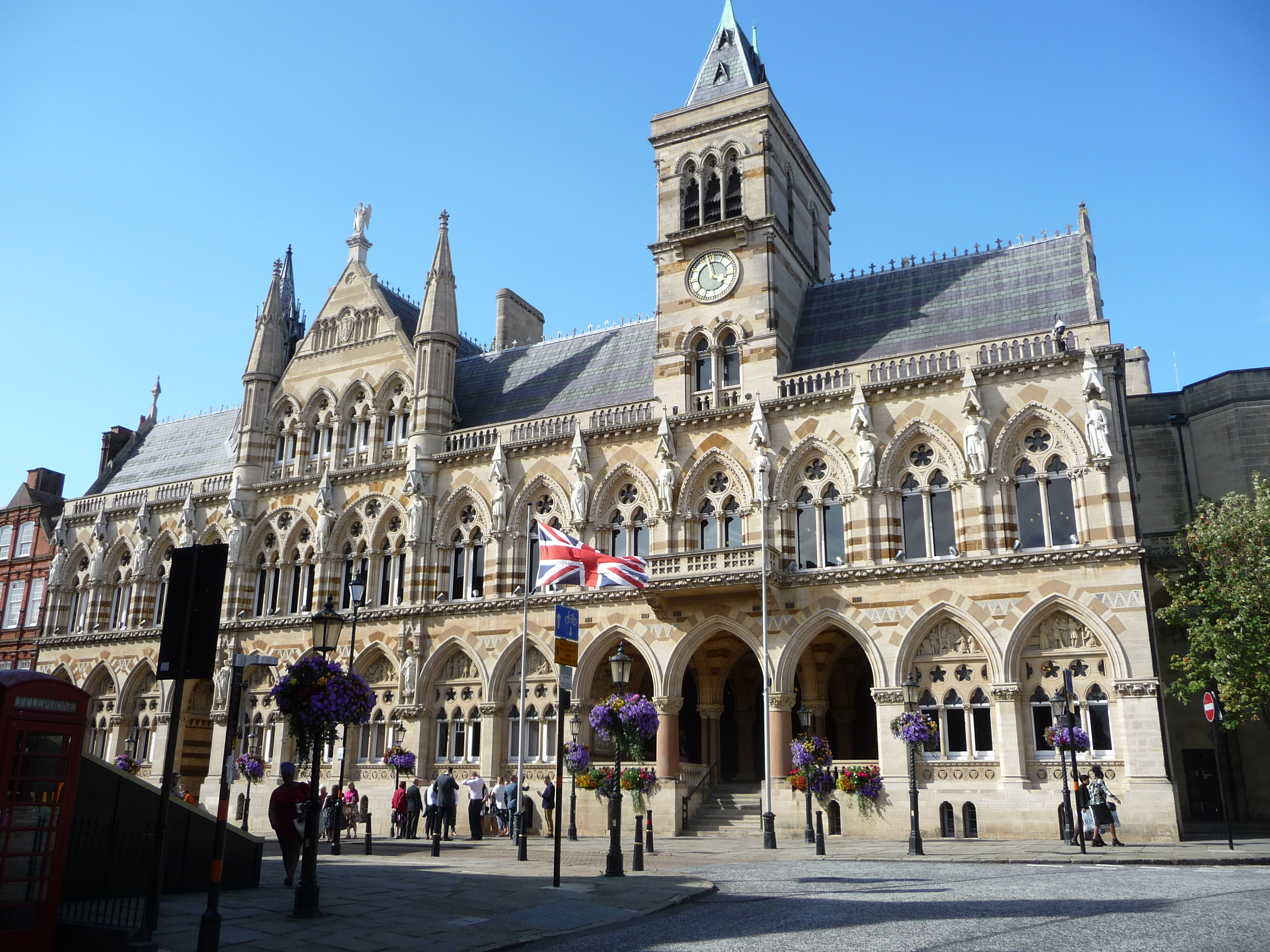
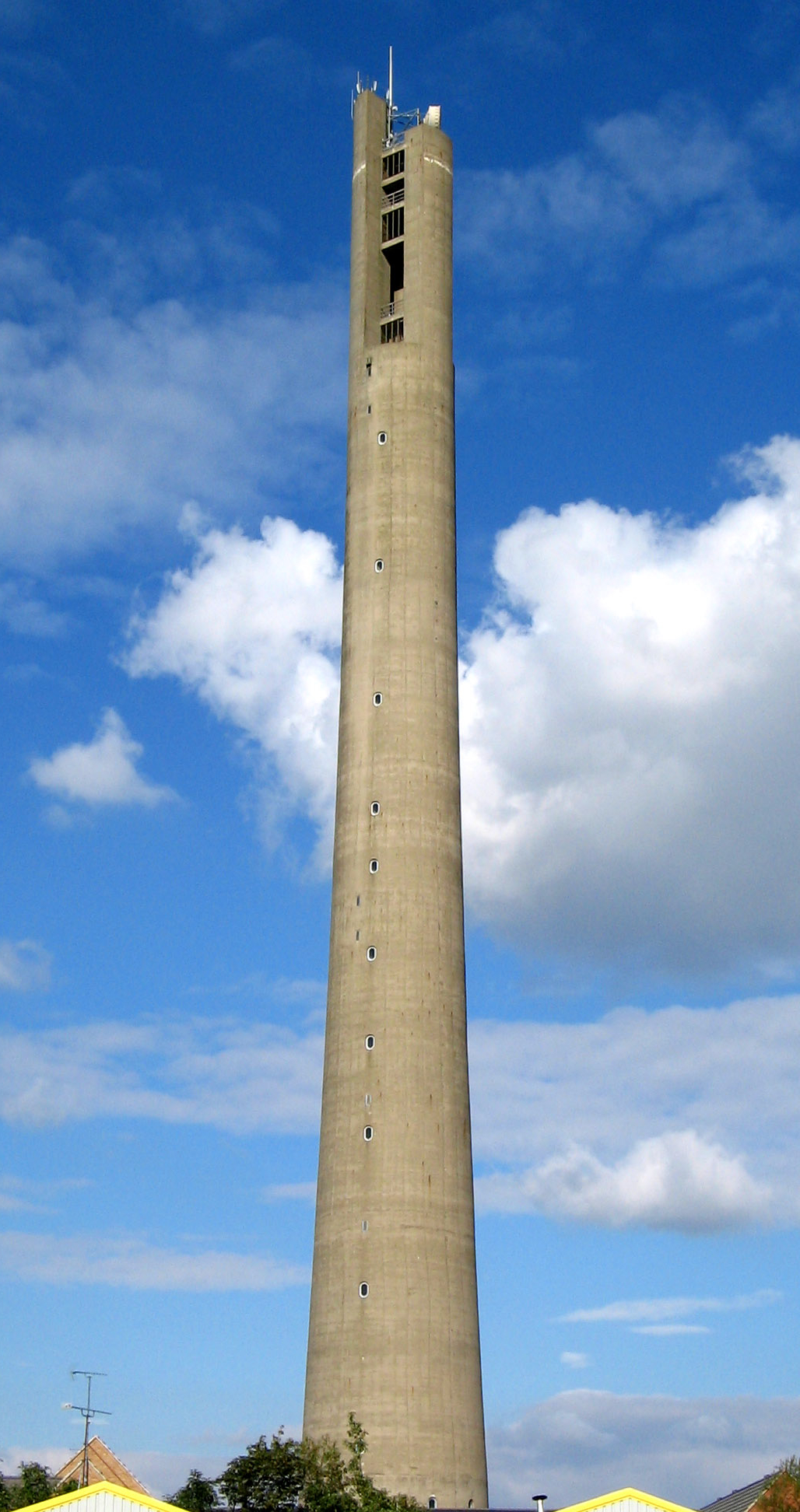
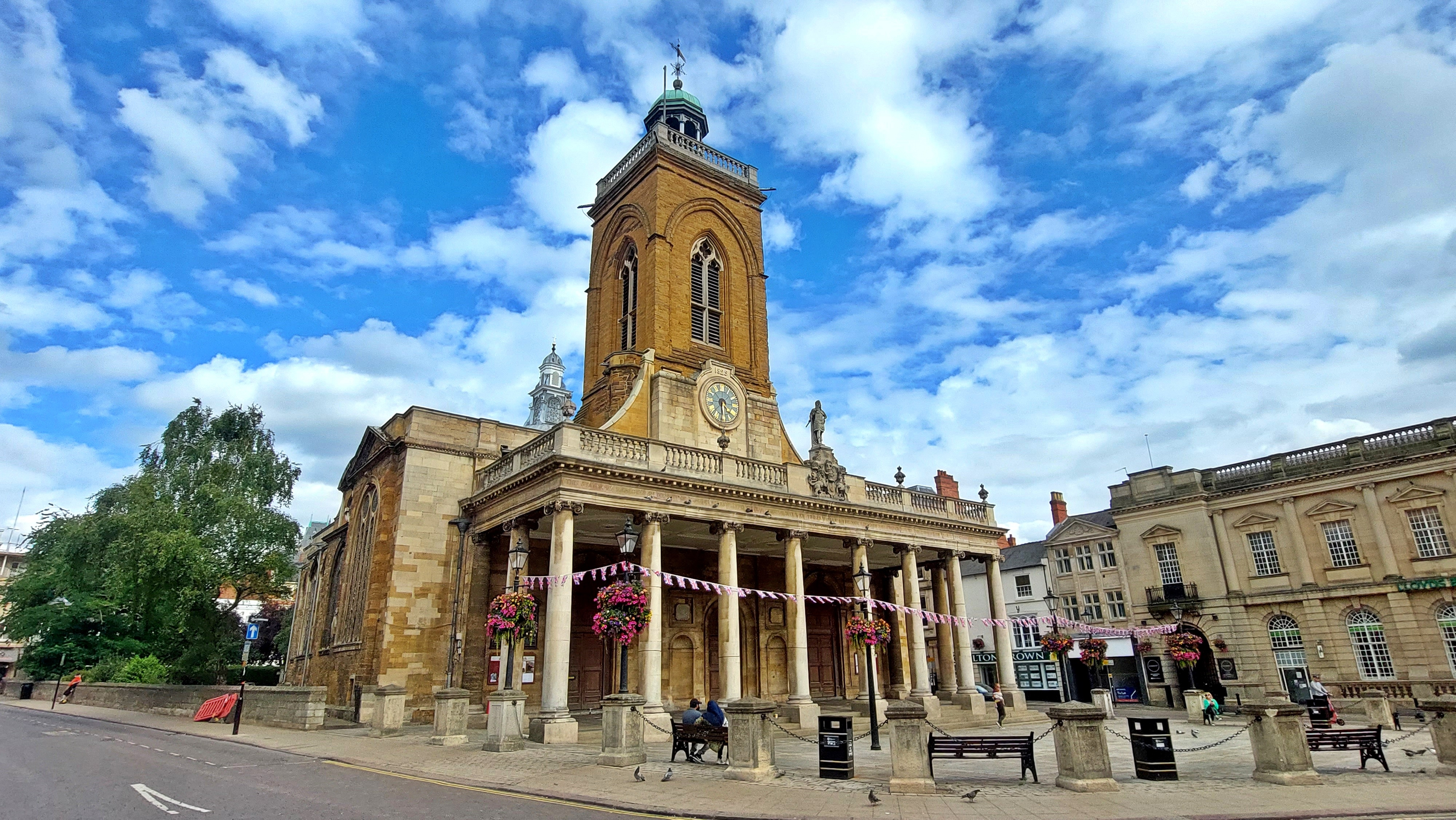
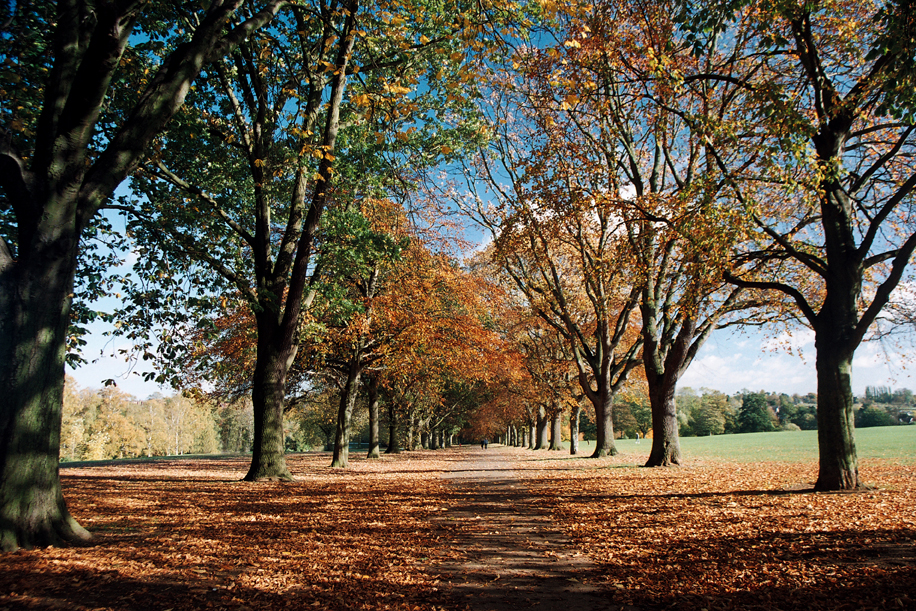
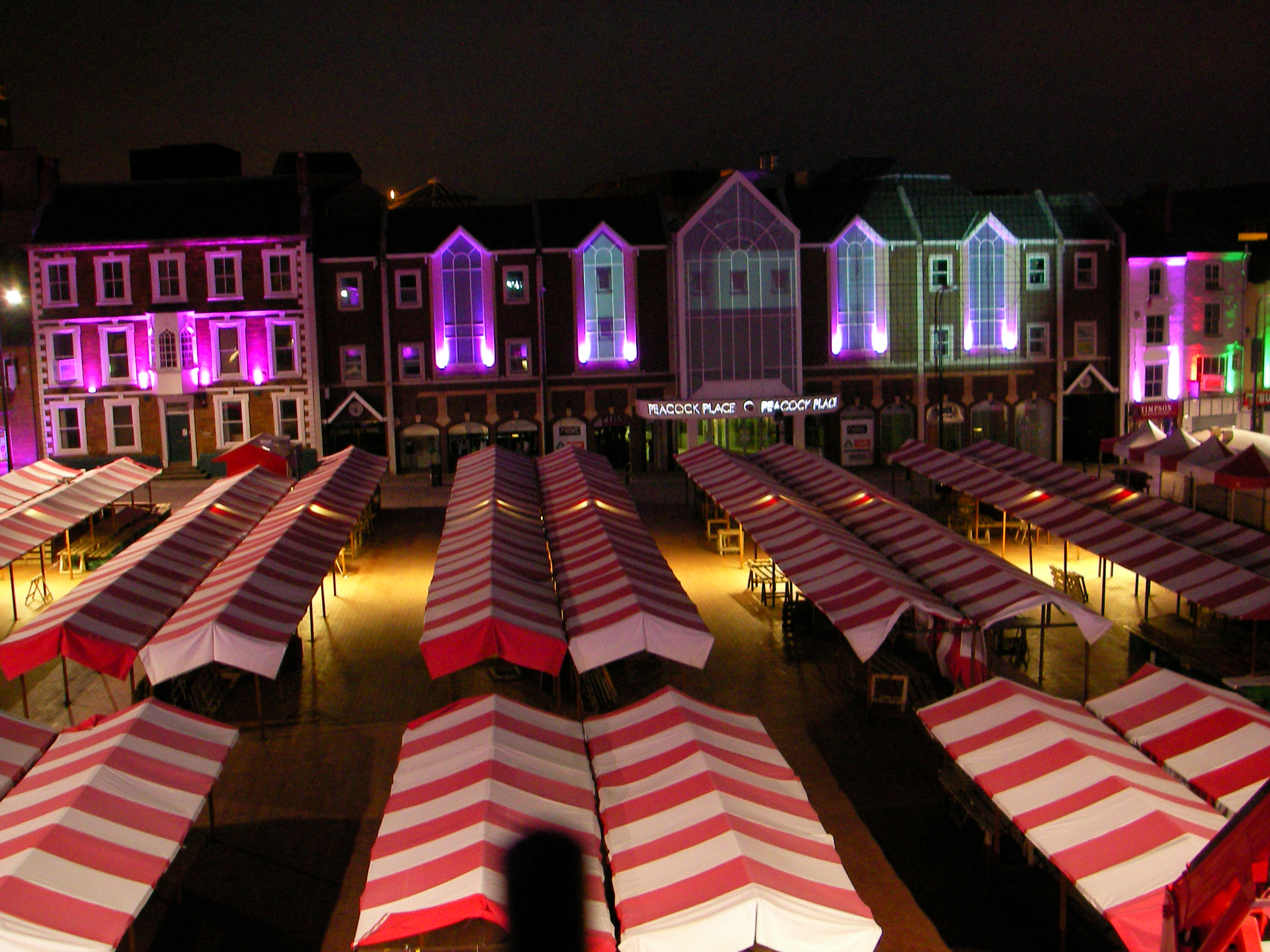
- Guildhall Lift Tower All Saints' Church Abington Park Market Square

- Location within Northamptonshire
- Population: 249,093 (2021 census)
- Civil parish: Northampton
- Unitary authority: West Northamptonshire
- Ceremonial county: Northamptonshire
- Region: East Midlands
- Country: England
- Sovereign state: United Kingdom
- Areas of the town: List: Abington; Boughton; Boothville; Brackmills; Collingtree; Cotton End; Dallington; Delapre; Duston; East Hunsbury; Far Cotton; Hardingstone; Hopping Hill; Hunsbury Meadows; Kingsthorpe; Moulton; Rothersthorpe; Semilong; Town Centre; West Hunsbury; Wootton
- Post town: NORTHAMPTON
- Postcode district: NN1—NN7
- Dialling code: 01604
- Police: Northamptonshire
- Fire: Northamptonshire
- Ambulance: East Midlands
- UK Parliament: Northampton North; Northampton South

Northampton (/nɔːrˈθæmptən/ nor-THAMP-tən) is a town and civil parish in Northamptonshire, England. It is the county town of Northamptonshire and the administrative centre of the unitary authority of West Northamptonshire. The town is situated on the River Nene, 60 miles (97 km) north-west of London and 50 miles (80 km) south-east of Birmingham. Northampton is one of the largest settlements in England without city status; the population of its overall urban area was recorded as 249,093 in the 2021 census. The parish of Northampton alone had 137,387.

Archaeological evidence of settlement in the area dates to the Bronze Age, Romans and Anglo-Saxons. In the Middle Ages, the town rose to national significance with the establishment of Northampton Castle, an occasional royal residence which regularly hosted the Parliament of England. Medieval Northampton had many churches, monasteries and the University of Northampton, all enclosed by the town walls. It was granted a town charter by Richard I in 1189 and a mayor was appointed by King John in 1215. The town was also the site of two medieval battles, in 1264 and 1460.

The town largely supported the Parliamentary Roundheads during the English Civil War, which prompted Charles II to order the destruction of the town walls and most of the castle. The Great Fire of Northampton in 1675 also destroyed much of the historic town. Northampton was soon rebuilt and grew rapidly with the industrial development of the 18th century. The town continued to expand with the arrival of the Grand Union Canal and the railways in the 19th century, becoming a centre for footwear and leather manufacture.

Growth was limited following the World Wars until it was designated a New Town in 1968, accelerating development which has continued into the 21st century. Northampton unsuccessfully applied for city status four times; in 1992, 2000, 2002 and 2022.

== History ==
=== Etymology ===
The earliest reference to Northampton in writing occurred in 914 under the name Ham tune. The prefix North was added later to distinguish it from other towns called Hampton, most prominently Southampton. The Domesday Book (1086) records the town as Northantone, which evolved into Norhamptone by the 13th century and later Northampton by the 17th century.

=== Ancient ===
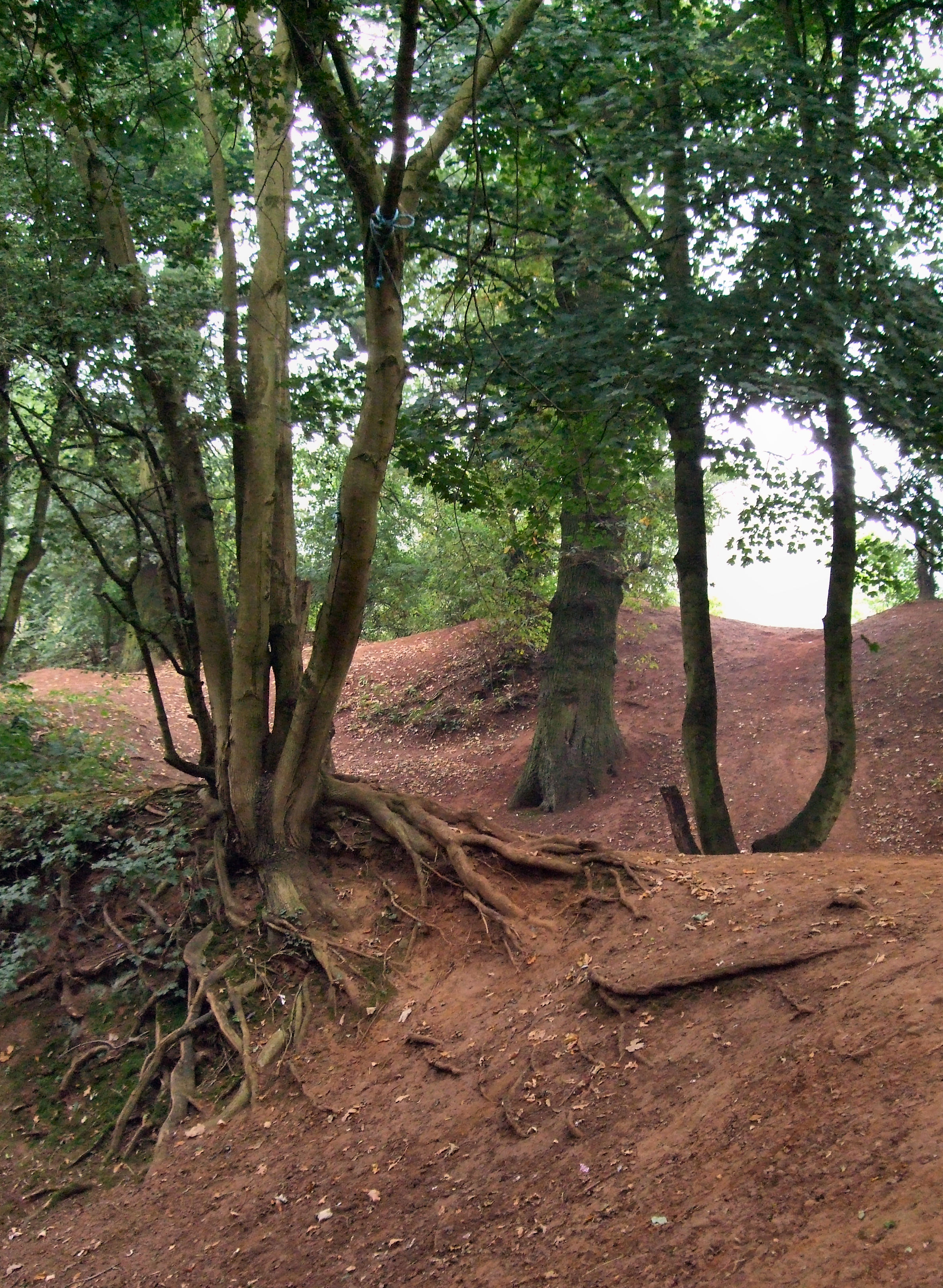
Earthworks at Hunsbury Hill, which was a settlement during the Iron Age

Present-day Northampton is the latest in a series of settlements that began in the Bronze Age. Remains found in the Briar Hill district show evidence of a Neolithic encampment within a large circular earthwork where local farmers assembled for tribal ceremonies and seasonal events from approximately 3500 BC to 2000 BC.

During the British Iron Age, people typically lived in protected hill forts. Present-day Hunsbury Hill is an example of this settlement; a circular ditch and a bank faced with a wall of timber and enclosing an area of 160 acres (65 ha) which dates to around 400 BC. In the Roman period, a small rural settlement is thought to have existed in the present-day district of Duston; remains of Roman pottery were found there.

Following a Danish invasion, the central area of the town was turned into a stronghold called a burh probably by the Anglo-Saxons. By the time of the Peace of Wedmore in 878 the Burgh was in possession of the Danes and became the base for one of the Danish armies. A ditch was dug around the settlement and it was fortified with earth ramparts. Having conquered Mercia, the Danes turned the settlement into a centre for military and administrative purposes, which was part of the Danelaw. The Danish army of Northampton however submitted to Edward the Elder, Saxon King of Wessex (who controlled the southern and western part of the English Kingdom of Mercia) in 921

In the 9th century Regenhere of Northampton, an East Anglian Saint with localised veneration, was buried in Northampton. By 918, Northampton had an earl and an army dependent upon it, whose territory extended to the River Welland.

Edward the Elder turned Northampton into the centre of one of the new shires, and it prospered as a river port and trading centre. In 940, it resisted the invading forces of Danish opposition in Northumbria when the Mercians successfully defended the town in a siege by King Olaf of York, but was burnt in 1010 by a Danish army, and again in 1065 by the rebellious northern earls Edwin and Morcar. Despite this, the Domesday Book records Northantone as possessing 316 houses with a population of 2000 people, ranking between Warwick and Leicester in size.

=== Medieval ===
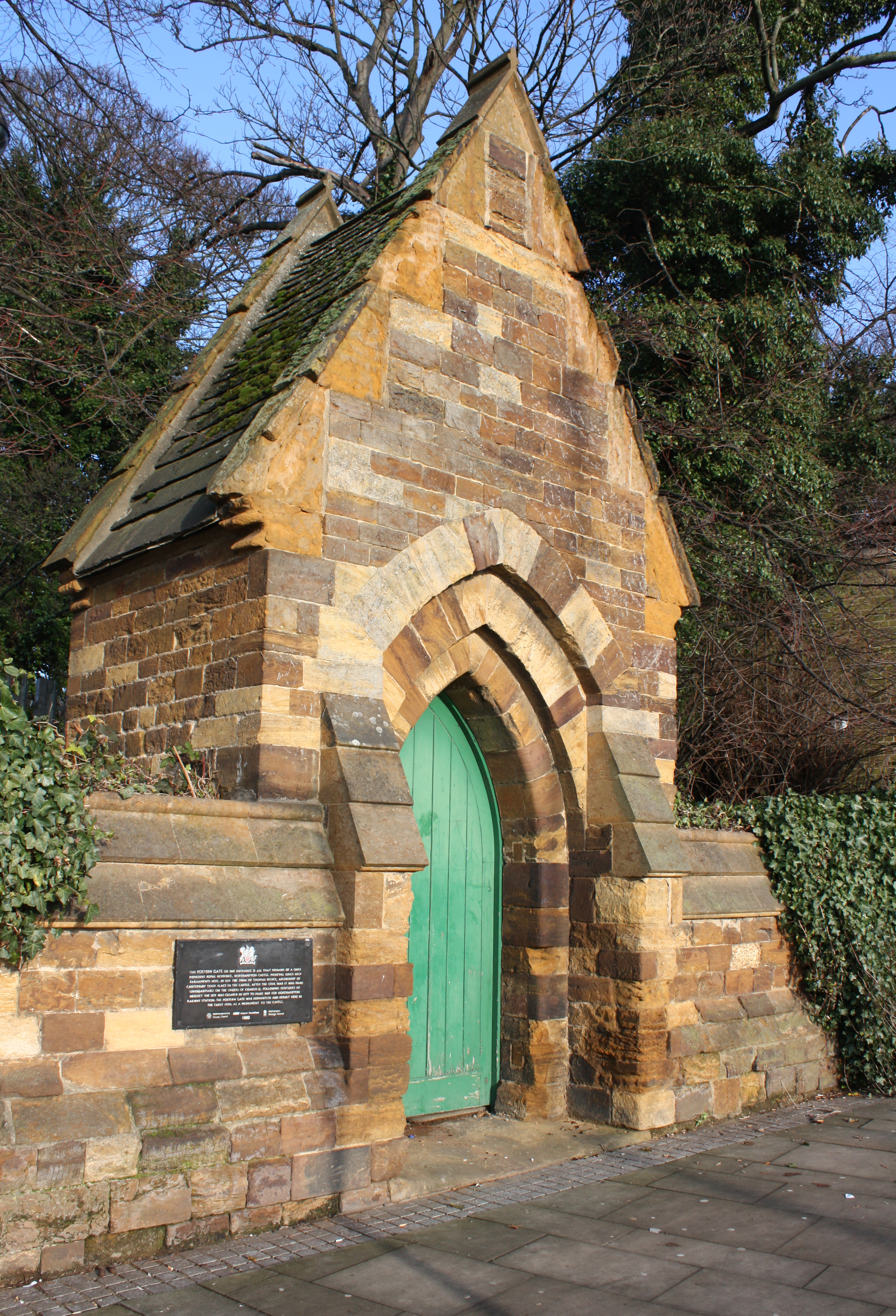
Northampton Castle was a royal residence and held the Parliament of England, but was eventually demolished for a railway station. A postern, rebuilt into a wall by the station, is all that remains.

With the Norman Conquest of England in 1066, the town rose to national significance; its geographical location in the centre of England made Northampton a valuable strategical point for government and as a convenient meeting place for political, social, ecclesiastical and military events.

Northampton Castle is thought to have been built by Simon de Senlis, who became the first Earl of Northampton, circa 1084. It was originally an earth and timber stockaded construction which was later rebuilt in stone. The castle became an occasional royal residence from the reign of King Henry I in 1130, until that of King Richard II. King John regularly stayed at the castle and moved The Treasury there in 1205. Some 32 Parliaments were held there. The last Parliament at Northampton was held in 1380. Significant events in the castle's history include the trial of Thomas Becket in 1164, the publication of the Assize of Northampton in 1176, the declaration of peace with Scotland in the Treaty of Edinburgh–Northampton, the passage of the Statute of Northampton in 1328 and the imposition of poll tax in 1380. Royal tournaments and feasts were also held at the castle.

Simon de Senlis is also thought to have built the medieval town walls, which enclosed about 245 acres (99 ha) and had four main gates. Since demolished, the circular pattern of the main roads surrounding the town centre marks the original position of the walls. de Senlis founded the Cluniac Priory of St Andrew's in the area of Semilong, and built The Church of the Holy Sepulchre – one of four remaining round churches in England – and All Hallows' Church on the current site of All Saints' Church. His son, Simon II de Senlis, built St Peter's Church on a site between a former Anglo-Saxon palace and Northampton Castle. Simon II de Senlis also founded Delapré Abbey – another Cluniac priory – which still stands today. Other priories in medieval Northampton include St James' Abbey, Graye Friers, Blackfriars and Whitefriars. St. John's, a medieval hospital, was situated east of Bridge Street. Medieval tunnels remain under the centre of Northampton around All Saints' Church and the Market Square but their purpose, extent and significance have been disputed.

The town was originally controlled by officials acting for the King who maintained law and order and collected taxes. This changed on 18 November 1189, when King Richard I granted the town its first charter in exchange for money to fund his crusades. The charter allowed the townspeople certain rights and independence in legal and administrative matters. In 1215, King John authorised the appointment of William Tilly as the town's first Mayor and ordered that "twelve of the better and more discreet [residents] of your town" join him as a council to assist him. The importance of Northampton at this time is underlined by the fact that only London, York and King's Lynn had mayors by this date. The mayor later ruled with 24 councillors and 48 freemen in a closed body until 1835.

In 1261, King Henry III established a University of Northampton by royal charter. Had it survived, it would have been the third oldest university founded in England after Oxford and Cambridge. However, after members of the university sided with Simon de Montfort in rebellion against the King, in 1265 the king revoked his decision, suppressing the university on the grounds that it was a threat to Oxford's academic hegemony.

Markets and fairs were a key element in the town's economy in medieval times. The Market Square came to prominence in 1235, with Henry III ordering that the sale of goods in All Saints churchyard should be relocated there. Street names in the town give an indication of trades and market centres; The Drapery, Woolmonger Street, Mercers Row, Gold Street, Sheep Street and Horse Market. Cloth and wool were very important but these industries declined. In the 13th century, Northampton had a large Jewish population centred on Gold Street. In 1277, two years after Edward I passed the Statute of the Jewry, some Jewish residents were executed while the remainder were driven out of town. Archaeological sites include a medieval Jewish cemetery and the Northampton Medieval Synagogue.

The First Barons' War caused significant destruction to Northampton. The barons besieged Northampton Castle in protest at King John's oppression of his subjects. In retaliation, royalist forces destroyed a large part of the town. When the forces of King Henry III overran the supporters of Simon de Montfort, the Second Barons' War broke out. The First Battle of Northampton took place in 1264 near and at the site of Northampton Castle where King Henry III and his son Prince Edward attacked with a large army, pillaged the town and took prisoners.

In 1349, the Black Death pandemic killed more than half the population of Northampton. In 1377, the population was 2,200. The town was rapidly losing its wealth and its importance as a national centre. In 1460, the Second Battle of Northampton took place during the War of the Roses in the meadows between the River Nene and Delapré Abbey. The Yorkists defeated the Lancastrians and King Henry VI was taken prisoner. In 1484, the Mayor declared that Northampton was "in great desolation and ruin". The Dissolution of the Monasteries in 1538 led to further destruction of what remained of the medieval town. Northampton was severely affected by Plague between March and September 1638 when 665 people died.

=== Early modern ===
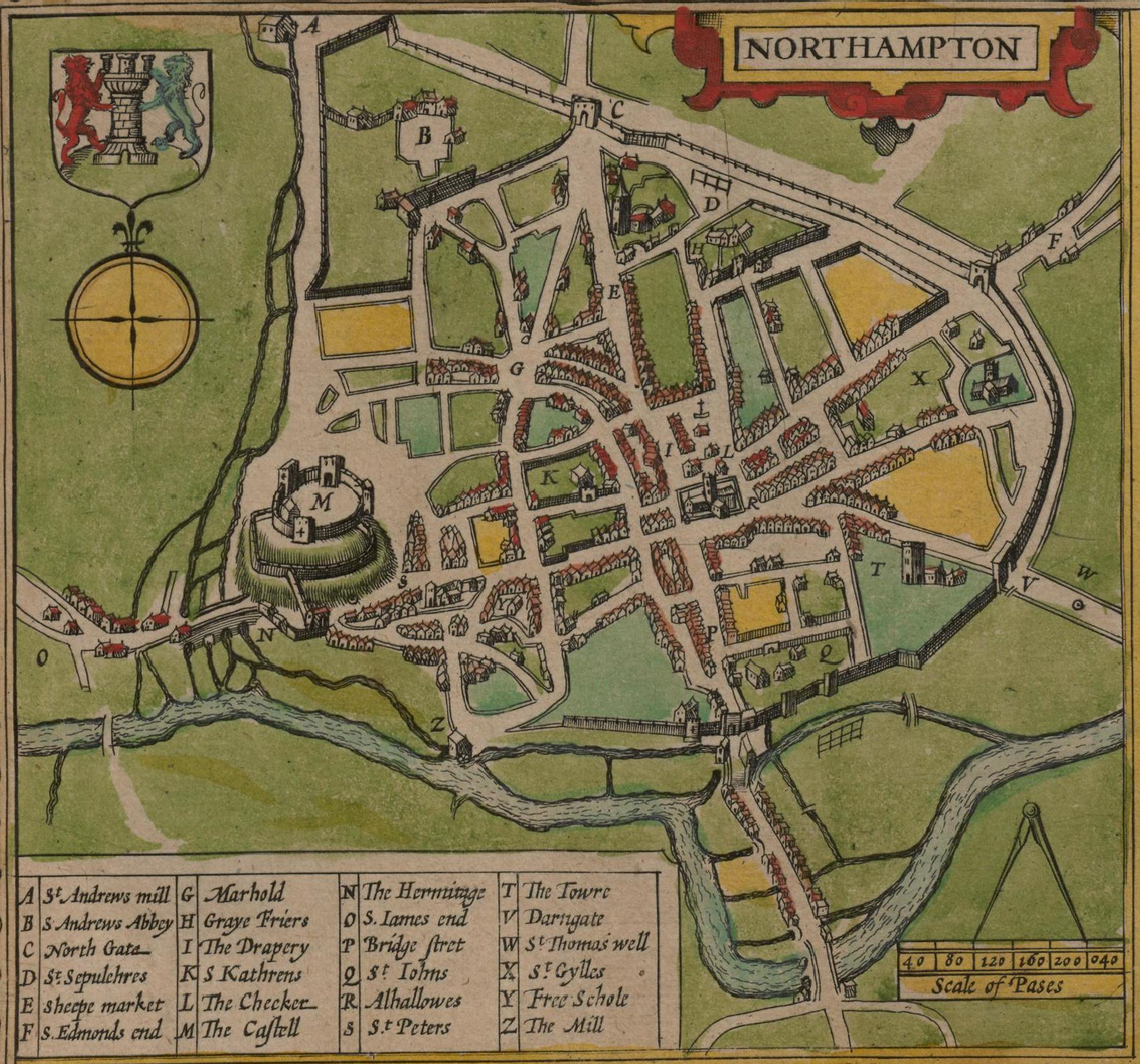
Map of Northampton by John Speed produced around 1610. Showing the castle and town walls.

The royal connection to Northampton Castle became less significant and, by the time of the English Civil War, Northampton was decidedly pro-Parliament. Though Spencer Compton, Earl of Northampton, was a royalist (Cavalier) and backed King Charles I, the people of Northampton supported Parliament and Oliver Cromwell's Roundhead army. The town had a long history of religious dissent from the Lollards and Puritanism gained a strong hold on the town. The corporation of the town, having already refused to provide troops to the King in 1632 or to pay the notorious ship money tax in 1636, petitioned Parliament in 1642 against papists and bishops.

When war broke out in 1642, the town willingly became the main Parliamentarian garrison for the south-east Midlands area with the former royal castle as its headquarters. In 1643, Prince Rupert attacked Northampton with approximately 2,000 men, but was beaten back at the North Gate of the town. Oliver Cromwell visited in 1645 and General Fairfax marched from the town to Naseby, where Charles I's Royalist army was decisively defeated. Over 4,000 pairs of leather shoes and 600 pairs of cavalry jack-boots for the Parliamentary armies were manufactured in Northampton during the Civil War, and a further 2,000 for Cromwell's New Model Army in 1648. Until well into the 19th century, the shoe industry boomed in and around the town with small manufacturing workshops set up in the surrounding areas.

The war ended with a Parliamentary victory, resulting in England becoming a Commonwealth, which lasted a decade. Following the restoration of King Charles II in 1660, he took revenge on the town by ordering the destruction of its walls and partial demolition of its castle in 1662, since it did not support his father Charles I and his cavaliers. From then on, the castle was used as a court and a jail, but its physical condition worsened. The new council of the town had to pay £200 to have its charter renewed and also required all officials to swear the oath of allegiance and some confirmed by the Crown.

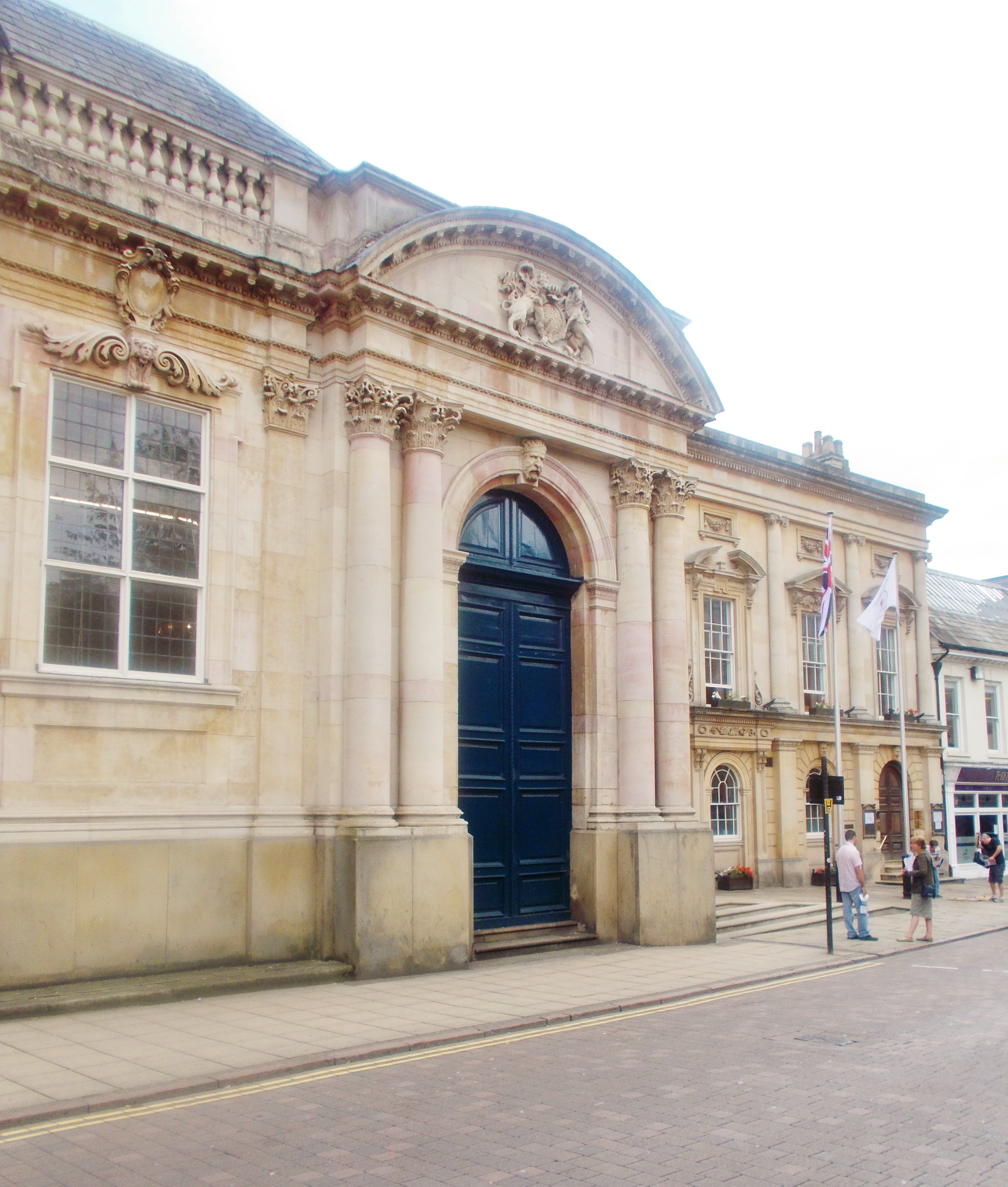
Sessions House was one of the first buildings built after the Great Fire of Northampton (1675)

The town centre was further destroyed by the Great Fire of Northampton in 1675, caused by sparks from an open fire in a thatched cottage by the castle. The fire spread eastwards by strong westerly winds and consumed three-quarters of the town centre in 24 hours. Matters were worsened because most buildings were chiefly made of wood and covered with thatch. An estimated 600 buildings were destroyed, amounting to £150,000 lost. Very little survived the fire, apart from buildings made of stone; these included the Welsh House on Market Square, built in 1595, and Hazelrigg House in Mare Fair, built in 1662.

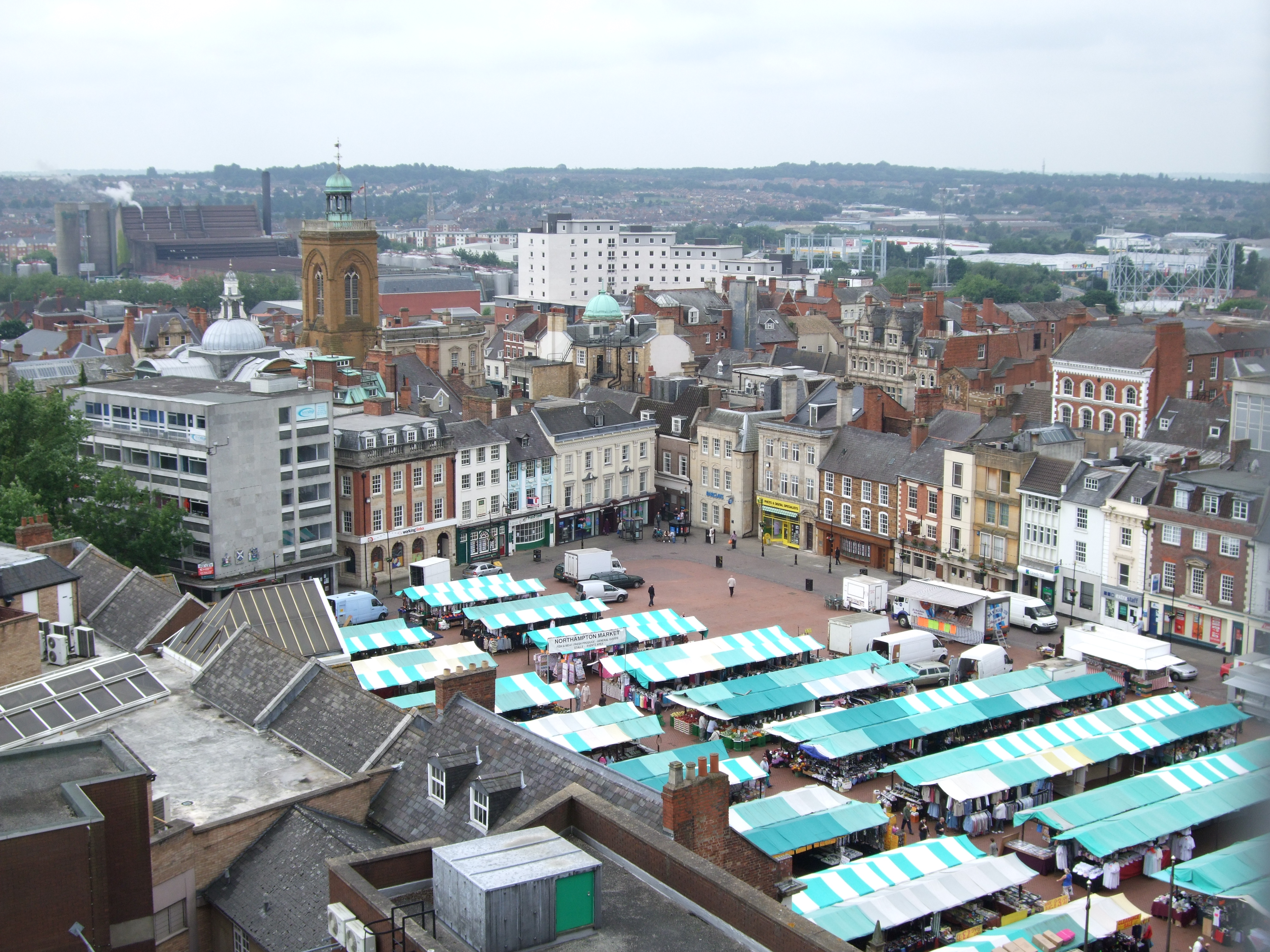
Northampton Market Square

The devastation led to an Act of Parliament for the rebuilding the town. Local people and businesses helped to raise around £25,000 towards the rebuilding of the town centre based around the Market Square. Streets were widened and buildings made of brick and stone and tiled to prevent such devastation again. In an act of reconciliation, King Charles II donated timber from the royal forests of Salcey and Whittlebury to help with the rebuild. In 1678, the Sessions House and what is now County Hall were amongst the first buildings to be completed. A Georgian town with new houses, shops and workshops eventually grew out of the old medieval town destroyed by the fire. In 1742, Edward Cave opened Marvel's Mill, the world's first cotton mill to be driven by a water wheel, on the River Nene.

A permanent military presence was established in the town with the completion of Gibraltar Barracks in 1797.

By the end of the 18th century, Northampton had become a major centre of footwear and leather manufacture. In 1801, the population was 7,020; it more than doubled to 15,351 in 1831, attributed to the fact that there was great demand for footwear caused by the Napoleonic Wars of the late 18th and early 19th centuries. A third of the adult males alone were shoemakers at the time. Northampton grew beyond the old town walls and industry grew rapidly with the mechanisation of factories by the middle of the 19th century.

=== Transport improvements ===
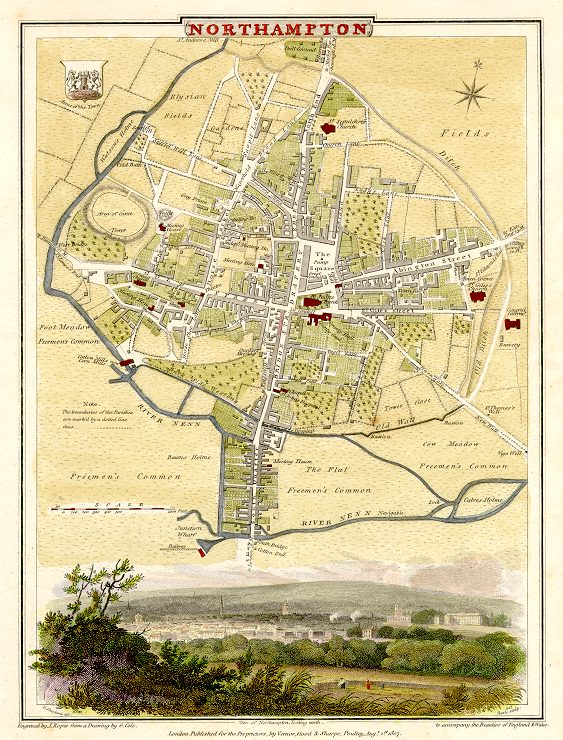
A map of Northampton in 1810

The Nene Navigation Company had previously made the River Nene navigable from King's Lynn as far up as Northampton in 1762, allowing cheap transportation of coal and other goods to the town, but in 1815, the Grand Union Canal reached the town, joining the River Nene, giving the town a direct link to the Midlands coalfields and to Birmingham, Manchester and London.

The first railway to be built into Northampton was the Northampton and Peterborough Railway, a branch from the main London and Birmingham Railway from Blisworth to Peterborough through Northampton which opened in 1845 along with the town's first railway station, Bridge Street station. This was followed by the opening of Castle station in 1859 on the site of part of the historic Northampton Castle, and later St. John's Street station in 1872. The Northampton loop of the West Coast Main Line was built in the late 1870s. Castle station was rebuilt and expanded over the site of Northampton Castle, the remains of which were purchased and demolished in 1880 to make way for the goods shed. St John's Street Station closed in 1939 and Bridge Street Station closed in 1964, leaving only Castle Station serving the town. It is now known simply as Northampton railway station.

Tram lines were also laid down in the town in 1881 and electrified in 1903. An early omnibus service ran to Wellingborough, and since 1919 motor omnibus services ran to villages around the town which brought buyers and sellers to the market.

=== Late 19th-century church building ===
When Bishop of Peterborough (from 1868 to 1891), William Connor Magee devoted considerable effort to ministering to the rapidly growing population of Northampton. Responses to the questions he circulated to the clergy of the Rural Deanery of Northampton in preparation for formal visitations held in the years 1872, 1875, 1878, 1882 and 1888 have been published, including a detailed introduction describing the condition of the town at that time and associated issues. During that period, the number of relevant Anglican parishes and ecclesiastical districts increased from 11 to 16.

=== Quarrying ===
There were iron ore quarries in the countryside around the town during the nineteenth and twentieth centuries, which have left their mark on the landscape. Some of the quarries were in what is now the town area, in an arc from Kingsthorpe through Duston and Hunsbury, round to Hardingstone beginning in about 1860. Some have now been built over. The town area quarries that lasted the longest were at Hunsbury, which began working in 1877 and closed in 1920. There are remains of some of these quarries at Hunsbury Hill. There was an iron works by the river to the west of the town, next to the railway, that then operated between Northampton and Blisworth. This was called the Hunsbury Ironworks, which operated between about 1874 and January 1921, using ore from these quarries and elsewhere.

=== Contemporary ===
Following World War I, the shoe industry was increasingly in decline, despite the town's factories supplying over 23 million pairs of boots to the armed forces. A total of 1,700 men from the town were lost of the 6,000 killed from the Northamptonshire Regiment. The town expanded further during the 1920s and saw the erection of Northampton Power Station, which supplied electricity to areas as far away as Wolverton, until its closure in 1975. Much council housing was also built largely to the east, north and south of the town, including Abington, Far Cotton, Kingsley, Kingsthorpe and Dallington—areas which had been incorporated within the borough's boundaries in 1901. However, the population growth slowed down as people moved beyond its boundaries. In 1901, the population had expanded to 90,923; in 1931, the population was 92,341.

Following World War II, Northampton changed vastly. In 1959, the M1 motorway was opened to the south-west of the town; in 1968, Northampton was designated a New Town. Both these events and the rail link helped Northampton's growth as a commuter town for London. The Northampton Development Corporation (NDC) was set up in 1968, to redevelop the town substantially in partnership with the local council, spending £205 million to build new housing and industrial estates. Initially, these were built in Lumbertubs, Moulton Park and Round Spinney to the east, followed by Briar Hill, Camp Hill and East and West Hunsbury in the south of the town; this was mainly to accommodate the overflow population of new residents from the London area. In the town centre, older buildings were demolished and replaced or redeveloped for other buildings, including the former Greyfriars bus station, the Grosvenor Centre, Peacock Place (now Market Walk), shops, flats and hotels.

Although growth was slower than planned, the population grew from 105,421 in 1961 to 157,217 by 1981, with 15,655 new homes added to the town between 1970 and 1985. The borough boundaries also changed following a split of the Northampton parliamentary constituency into Northampton North and Northampton South in 1974. Northampton was reconstituted as a non-metropolitan district, which also covered areas outside the former borough boundaries but inside the designated New Town. The town tried for unitary status during the 1990s UK local government reform, but failed and it remained a non-metropolitan district until its abolition in 2021. On Good Friday 1998, Northampton suffered severe flooding, particularly in the areas of Far Cotton and St James; two people were killed and thousands of homes were affected.

Since the turn of the new millennium, the town has continued to expand. Northampton applied for city status in 2000 to celebrate the new millennium, in 2002 to celebrate the Golden Jubilee of Elizabeth II and most recently in 2022 to celebrate the Platinum Jubilee of Elizabeth II; it has failed on all three occasions and remains a town.

In 2006, Northampton became a government expansion zone, with new growth promoted by West Northamptonshire Development Corporation (WNDC), an unelected quango, which has provoked a series of regeneration schemes across the town. Some have been completed, including:

- the opening of the Radlands Plaza Skatepark
- the development of Becket's Park Marina, just south of Northampton's town centre
- the improvement of the town's Market Square
- the building of the new North Gate bus station
- the rebuilding of the railway station
- the designation of a Cultural Quarter
- the building of a new Council headquarters
- the restoration of Delapré Abbey
- the expansion of Northampton Museum
- the resiting and rebuilding of the university on one new campus in the town centre
- the renovation of both the Grosvenor Shopping Centre and Weston Favell Centre.

In 2015, St Giles Street in the town centre was named the "Best British High Street" in a national competition run by the Department for Communities and Local Government. In 2024 the market square was excavated and redesigned.

== Governance ==
=== National representation ===
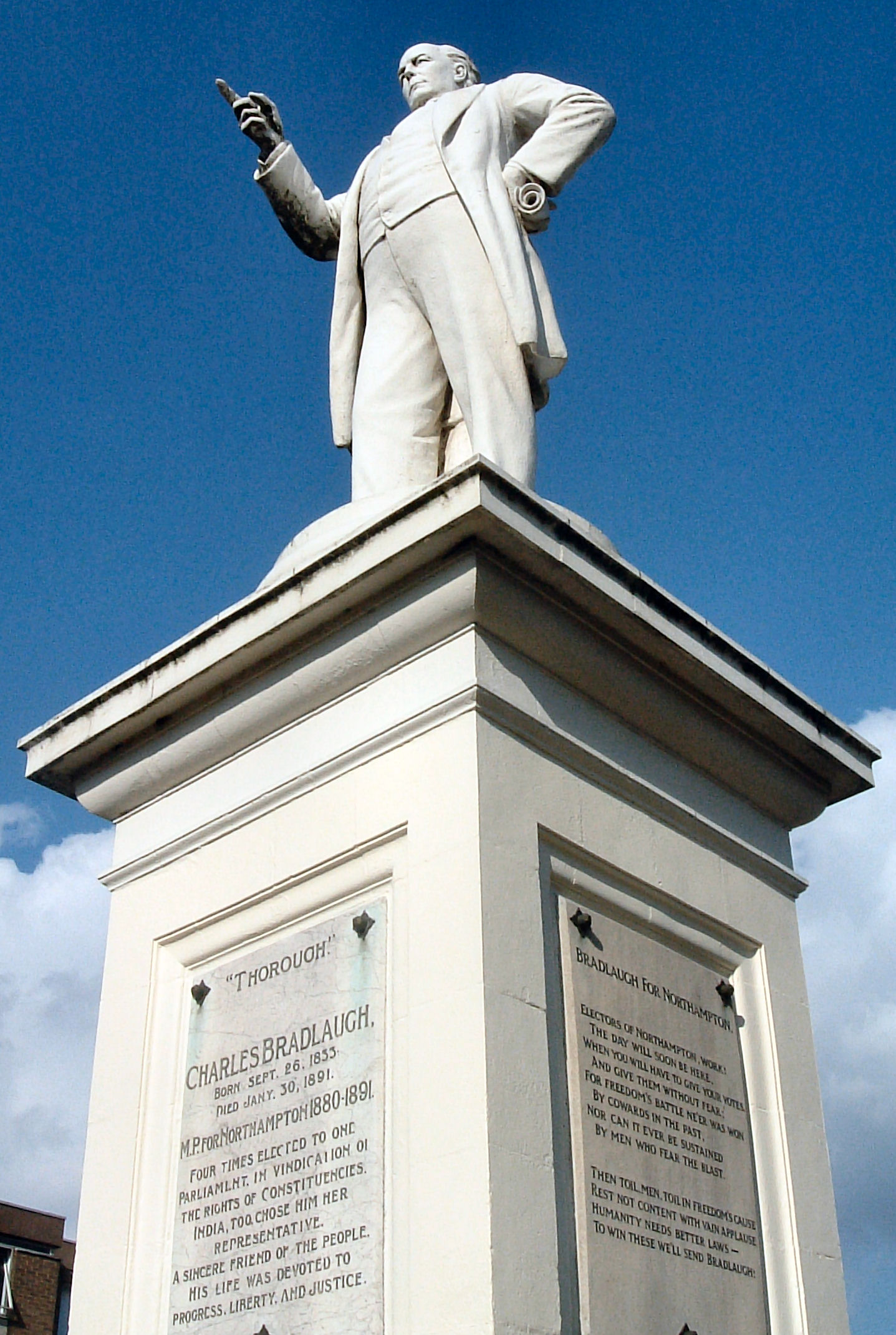
The statue of the Northampton MP Charles Bradlaugh

Northampton was inaugurated as a constituency in 1295; for many centuries, it returned two Members of Parliament (MPs) to the House of Commons. Spencer Perceval was elected as one of these in 1796 and became Prime Minister of the United Kingdom in 1809, the only Solicitor General and only Attorney General to have done so, but also the only prime minister to be assassinated. The murder was by a highly disgruntled business owner John Bellingham in the House of Commons lobby in 1812. By the late 19th century, Northampton had acquired a reputation for political vanguardism. In 1880, radical non-conformist Charles Bradlaugh was elected as one of the MPs. During one of his election cross-candidate hustings a riot broke out in the Market Square. Local figures of authority called military to disperse it. For some decades following the 1918 general election, representation was reduced to one MP.

In 1974, the original Northampton seat was replaced by the new constituencies of Northampton North and Northampton South, which both elected one MP each, beginning in the February 1974 general election. For the 2010 general election, the new South Northamptonshire constituency took a southern sector of the borough. The southern sectors were transferred to Northampton South for the 2024 general election.

Northampton is currently represented by two Labour MPs:

- Lucy Rigby (Northampton North)
- Mike Reader (Northampton South)

=== Local government ===
The borough from 1974 to 2021, shown within Northamptonshire

The main governing body for Northampton since 2021 has been West Northamptonshire Council which is a unitary authority covering Northampton and the western half of Northamptonshire. Northampton is also covered by 13 civil parishes which form a more local tier of government.

==== Civic history ====
The town existed as an ancient borough in the medieval period, before being one of the 178 boroughs to be reformed under the Municipal Corporations Act in 1835, with a democratically elected council replacing the corporation before it. Town government alternated between the Liberals and Conservatives, and the town achieved independence from Northamptonshire in 1888 when it became a county borough. It had six electoral wards from 1898, nine wards from 1900 and 12 wards from 1911. From 1931 until it was abolished in 1974, the county borough contained only the parish of Northampton.

On 1 April 1974, the county borough and parish were abolished and the area became part of the new Northampton district in the non-metropolitan county of Northamptonshire.

The new Northampton district was formed from:

- the County Borough of Northampton
- Northampton Rural District—the parishes of Billing and Hardingstone and the parts of the parishes of Brafield-on-the-Green, Collingtree, Courteenhall, Great Houghton, Kislingbury, Little Houghton, Milton Malsor, Rothersthorpe, Upton and Wootton in the designated area of Northampton New Town
- Brixworth Rural District—the part of the parish of Overstone in the designated new town
- Wellingborough Rural District—the part of the parish of Ecton in the designated new town.

No successor parish was formed so the former county borough became unparished.

The new district was granted modern borough status in 1974. From 1974 until 2021, the town had a two-tier structure of local government: the non-metropolitan district of Northampton was administered by both Northampton Borough Council and Northamptonshire County Council.

Propositions for the borough to become a unitary authority failed during the 1990s local government reform and again, in 2011, when the motion was voted down by the council. However, in 2016, the borough council and all seven Northamptonshire MPs called for the existing eight Northamptonshire councils be scrapped for new unitary authorities.

In March 2018, following suspension of the County Council arising from its becoming insolvent, due to financial and cultural mismanagement by the cabinet and officers, the then Secretary of State for Local Government, Sajid Javid, sent commissioner Max Caller into the council. He recommended that the county council and all district and borough councils in the county be abolished; these would be replaced by two unitary authorities: one covering the west and one the north of the county. These proposals were approved in April 2019. It meant that the districts of Daventry, Northampton and South Northamptonshire were merged to form a new unitary authority called West Northamptonshire, whilst the second unitary authority North Northamptonshire consists of Corby, East Northamptonshire, Kettering and Wellingborough districts. These new authorities came into being on 1 April 2021. Elections for the new authorities were due to be held on 7 May 2020, but these were delayed due to the COVID-19 pandemic, and took place in May 2021.

A year prior to these changes, three new civil parishes were created in Northampton's urban area: a large parish covering the majority of the Northampton urban area was created, allowing Northampton to have a Town (parish) Council. Northampton Town Council is the largest parish level authority in England. In addition, two smaller parishes were created for the suburbs of Far Cotton and Delapre and Kingsthorpe.

Policing in the town remains the responsibility of Northamptonshire Police; and firefighting, the responsibility of Northamptonshire Fire and Rescue Service. The Royal Anglian Regiment serves as the county regiment for Northamptonshire, with former county regiments being the Northamptonshire Regiment and the Northamptonshire Yeomanry

==== Civil parishes ====
The Northampton urban area is covered by 13 civil parishes. The parish councils of these form a local tier of government below West Northamptonshire Council. The largest by far of these is the area covered by Northampton Town Council, which was created in 2020; ten more, covering several outer suburbs were pre-existing; and two (Kingsthorpe and Far Cotton and Delapre) were created concurrently with the town council. These are:

- Billing
- Duston
- Collingtree
- East Hunsbury
- Far Cotton and Delapre
- Great Houghton
- Hardingstone
- Hunsbury Meadows
- Kingsthorpe
- Northampton
- Upton
- West Hunsbury
- Wootton

=== Health services ===
NHS Northampton guides primary care services (general practitioners, dentists, opticians and pharmacists) in the town, directly provides adult social care and services in the community; these include health visiting and physiotherapy and also funds hospital care and other specialist treatments. Northampton General Hospital is an NHS trust hospital, which was founded in 1744 and moved to its present site in 1793; it has continued to provide healthcare to the local community for more than 200 years. The East Midlands Ambulance Service NHS Trust is responsible for the provision of statutory emergency medical services in Northampton.

St Andrew's Hospital, the flagship mental health facility of the private company St Andrew's Healthcare, is also based in Northampton. Originally opened in 1838 to serve Northampton, St Andrew's became a charity and private healthcare provider when the Berrywood Asylum (later the Northampton County Lunatic Asylum, then St Crispin Hospital in 1948, and since 2010 Berrywood Hospital) opened in 1876.

== Geography ==
Northampton is formally in the East Midlands region but is also referred to in Government planning as being part of the South Midlands "growth area". The town is 30 miles (48 km) south-south-east of Leicester, 16 miles (26 km) north-north-west of Milton Keynes, 43 miles (69 km) west of Cambridge, 37 miles (60 km) north-east of Oxford and 37 miles (60 km) south-west of Peterborough.

=== Areas and suburbs ===
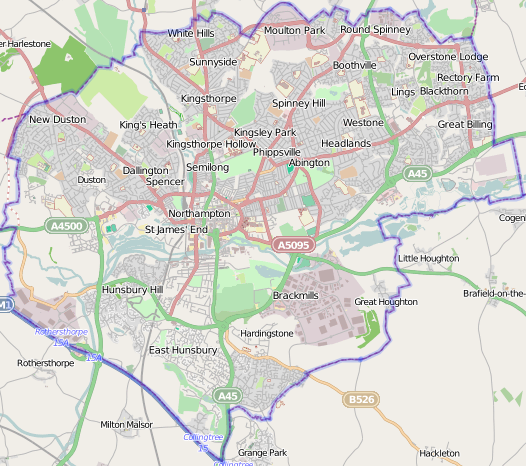
Map of the town suburbs

Northampton is subdivided into suburbs, council wards, constituencies, ecclesiastical parishes and other less formal areas.

Suburbs and districts of Northampton include:

- Abington Vale
- Abington
- Billing
- Blacky More
- Brackmills
- Collingtree
- Collingtree Park
- Cotton End
- Cultural Quarter
- Dallington
- Duston
- East Hunsbury
- Far Cotton
- Grange Park
- Great Houghton
- Hardingstone
- Hunsbury Meadows
- King's Heath
- Kingsley
- Kingsthorpe
- Merefield
- New Duston
- Queen's Park
- Round Spinney
- Shelfleys
- Sixfields
- Spinney Hill
- St James End
- Upton
- West Hunsbury
- Weston Favell
- White Hills
- Wootton

Concurrent with the abolition of the borough of Northampton in 2021, the unparished area of Northampton became parished with three new parish councils being established. A new Town Council covering the majority of the urban area of Northampton was established, whilst the areas of Kingsthorpe, Far Cotton and Delapré also gained parish councils. In addition, there are nine registered parish councils which predate the abolition of the borough of Northampton. These are Billing, Collingtree, Duston, Great Houghton, Hardingstone, Hunsbury Meadow, Upton, West Hunsbury and Wootton & East Hunsbury.

Other settlements that the Office for National Statistics considers part of the Northampton urban area include Boughton, Ecton, Moulton, Overstone and Rothersthorpe. At the 2011 census, Harpole, Cogenhoe, Grange Park, Little and Great Houghton, Overstone and Sywell were just outside the Northampton built up area; this may change when the 2021 boundaries are released.

=== Compass ===
Northampton's nearest towns are Wellingborough, Daventry and Towcester. The nearest cities are Milton Keynes, Leicester, Coventry and Peterborough.

=== Climate ===
As with the rest of the British Isles, Northampton experiences an oceanic climate with cool summers and mild winters. The official Met Office weather station for Northampton is the Moulton Park Weather Station at the University of Northampton. Situated at an elevation of around 130 m (427 ft) above sea level compared to Northampton town centre at 50 to 60 m (164 to 197 ft), it is one of the highest points in the town, and so may not be a perfect representation of Northampton as a whole. Its hilltop location means less pooling of cold air on calm clear nights and lower maxima during summer. The absolute maximum recorded is 34.7 °C (94.5 °F) on 3 August 1990. A high of 34.4 °C (93.9 °F) was recorded on 19 July 2006, However, a maximum temperature of 40.2 °C (104.4 °F) was recorded on 19 July 2022 at Pitsford, located 4.4 miles (7.1 km) from the town centre. The absolute minimum is −16.8 °C (1.8 °F), recorded during February 1986. It is likely the absolute maximum in the town centre is a degree or so higher owing to the lower elevation, and absolute minimum on the eastern and western edges of the urban area around the Nene valley a couple of degrees colder due to katabatic drainage of cold air allowing a frost hollow effect. Most recently, the temperature fell to −9.6 °C (14.7 °F) on 20 December 2010.

Rainfall, at around 650 mm (26 in) per year is not high, though is often unpredictable, giving rise to flooding events such as in 1998, but also short-term droughts. Desborough Weather Station also supplies the public with a local weather service.

Climate data for Northampton (Moulton Park), (Note: Weather station is located 2.6 miles (4.2 km) from the Northampton town centre.) elevation: 127 m (417 ft), 1991–2020 normals, extremes 1976–present (Note: Extreme temperature were recorded at Moulton Park (1976–2018) and at Pitsford (2006–present).)
Month	Jan	Feb	Mar	Apr	May	Jun	Jul	Aug	Sep	Oct	Nov	Dec	Year
Record high °C (°F)	14.9 (58.8)	17.9 (64.2)	22.6 (72.7)	26.5 (79.7)	28.0 (82.4)	32.1 (89.8)	40.2 (104.4)	34.7 (94.5)	30.3 (86.5)	27.9 (82.2)	17.5 (63.5)	15.4 (59.7)	40.2 (104.4)
Mean daily maximum °C (°F)	7.1 (44.8)	7.8 (46.0)	10.4 (50.7)	13.5 (56.3)	16.6 (61.9)	19.6 (67.3)	22.1 (71.8)	21.7 (71.1)	18.7 (65.7)	14.4 (57.9)	10.1 (50.2)	7.4 (45.3)	14.1 (57.4)
Daily mean °C (°F)	4.3 (39.7)	4.7 (40.5)	6.6 (43.9)	8.6 (47.5)	12.0 (53.6)	14.9 (58.8)	17.2 (63.0)	16.9 (62.4)	14.4 (57.9)	10.9 (51.6)	7.1 (44.8)	4.7 (40.5)	10.3 (50.5)
Mean daily minimum °C (°F)	1.6 (34.9)	1.6 (34.9)	2.9 (37.2)	4.7 (40.5)	7.3 (45.1)	10.2 (50.4)	12.3 (54.1)	12.2 (54.0)	10.1 (50.2)	7.4 (45.3)	4.2 (39.6)	2.0 (35.6)	6.4 (43.5)
Record low °C (°F)	−16.4 (2.5)	−16.8 (1.8)	−7.3 (18.9)	−5.8 (21.6)	−1.8 (28.8)	1.0 (33.8)	4.4 (39.9)	4.0 (39.2)	1.8 (35.2)	−3.9 (25.0)	−6.7 (19.9)	−12.2 (10.0)	−16.8 (1.8)
Average precipitation mm (inches)	56.2 (2.21)	44.6 (1.76)	40.4 (1.59)	46.9 (1.85)	53.6 (2.11)	52.2 (2.06)	51.7 (2.04)	59.6 (2.35)	55.7 (2.19)	66.7 (2.63)	61.6 (2.43)	60.1 (2.37)	649.2 (25.56)
Average precipitation days (≥ 1.0 mm)	11.9	9.9	8.4	9.5	9.2	9.2	8.6	9.0	8.9	10.4	11.5	11.4	118.0
Mean monthly sunshine hours	55.3	80.5	115.6	157.5	197.0	175.0	198.3	181.0	135.9	106.2	64.3	53.6	1,520
Source 1: Met Office
Source 2: Starlings Roost Weather; Pitsford Weather Centre

== Demographics ==
Northampton (local authority boundaries) population pyramid in 2021

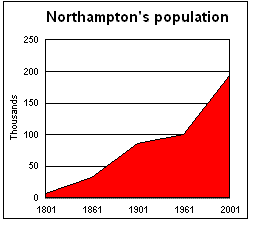

The town's population recorded at each census since 1801 was as follows:

Population of Northampton (local authority)
Year	Population
1801	7,020
1811	8,427
1821	10,793
1831	15,351
1841	21,242
1851	26,657
1861	32,813
1871	41,168
1881	51,881
1891	61,012
1901	87,021
1911	90,064
1921	90,895
1931	92,341
1941	No census
1951	104,432
1961	105,421
1971	133,800
1981	157,217
1991	180,617
2001	194,458
2011	212,069
2021	238,654

Since 1991, the population of the town has increased 17.41% from 180,617 to 212,069 in 2011, with a mean age in 2011 of 37.1 years, younger than the English average of 39.3 years. The population breaks down into 104,168 males, and 107,901 females, with a population density of 2,630 per km^{2}.

At the 2011 census, there were 91,484 dwellings, 88,731 of which are occupied households. Some 30.5% (27,048) of these were one person households, 61.1% (54,125) contained families, and 8.5% (7,558) fell into the "other household type" category. Home tenure was reported as 37.5% of 88,731 households mortgaged, 25.1% owned outright, 16.5% privately rented, 12.8% rented from council, 4.3% social rented, 1.3% private (other) rented, 1.3% shared ownership and 1.2% rent free.

75.6% of households had at least one car or van, 22.5% of residents over the age of 16 had no formal qualifications, and 15.8% have at least 5 GCSEs of grade C or above. The median income for all workers (in 2012) was £21,193, slightly below both the county average of £21,560, and the England average of £21,794.

Between 2001 and 2011, the greatest nominal population increase was in the White, Other group from 3,780 to 13,825 – an increase of 10,045 – likely due to migration from Eastern Europe. The largest growth relative to their 2001 numbers was in the Black, African group, recording a 376% increase from 1,361 to 6,473. The largest nominal fall in population was in respondents reporting as White, British, there being 8,146 fewer such residents in 2011 than 10 years previous. The largest fall relative to their 2001 numbers was in the White, Irish group, their count falling 20.3% from 3,838 down to 3,060.

=== Ethnicity ===
In the 2011 census, Northampton was 84.5% White, 6.5% Asian, 5.1% Black, and 3.2% Mixed/multiple.

Ethnic Group	Year (local authority boundaries)									
Ethnic Group	1981 estimations		1991 census		2001 census		2011		2021	
Ethnic Group	Number	%	Number	%	Number	%	Number	%	Number	%
White: Total	151,817	95.8%	173,457	94%	178,117	91.6%	179,238	84.5%	188,900	79.2%
White: British	–	–	–	–	170,499	87.7%	162,353	76.6%	152,516	63.9%
White: Irish	–	–	–	–	3,838	2%	2,911	1.4%	2,460	1.0%
White: Gypsy or Irish Traveller	–	–	–	–	–	–	149		257	0.1%
White: Roma	–	–	–	–	–	–	–	–	1,157	0.5%
White: Other	–	–	–	–	3,780	1.9%	13,825	6.5%	32,510	13.6%
Asian or Asian British: Total	3,205	2%	5,839		7,643	3.9%	13,751	6.5%	18,741	7.9%
Asian or Asian British: Indian	1,544		2,704		3,333		5,328		7,859	3.30%
Asian or Asian British: Pakistani	327		536		795		1,536		2,439	1.00%
Asian or Asian British: Bangladeshi	622		1,254		1,768		3,367		4,452	1.90%
Asian or Asian British: Chinese	409		720		1,278		1,705		1,418	0.60%
Asian or Asian British: Other Asian	303		625		469		1,815		2,573	1.10%
Black or Black British: Total	2,795		4,268		4,643	2.4%	10,741	5.1%	18,447	7.70%
Black or Black British: African	244		397		1,361		6,473		12,970	5.40%
Black or Black British: Caribbean	1,897		2,806		2,822		2,946		3,087	1.30%
Black or Black British: Other Black	654		1,065		460		1,322		2,390	1.00%
Mixed or British Mixed: Total	–	–	–	–	3,369	1.7%	6,849	3.2%	8,639	3.60%
Mixed: White and Black Caribbean	–	–	–	–	1,693		3,149		3,508	1.50%
Mixed: White and Black African	–	–	–	–	272		1,012		1,374	0.60%
Mixed: White and Asian	–	–	–	–	748		1,286		1,687	0.70%
Mixed: Other Mixed	–	–	–	–	656		1,402		2,070	0.90%
Other: Total	608		1,035		686	0.4%	1,490	0.7%	3,924	1.6%
Other: Arab	–	–	–	–	–	–	543		575	0.2%
Other: Any other ethnic group	608		1,035		686	0.4%	947		3,349	1.4%
Ethnic minority: Total	6,608		11,143		16,341	8.4%	32,831	15.5%	49,751	20.8%
Total	158,425	100%	184,600	100%	194,458	100%	212,069	100%	238,651	100%

=== Religion ===
In terms of religion, 48.7% of residents described themselves as Christian, 35.7% as irreligious, 5.6% as Muslim, 1.9% as Hindu, 0.6% as other religions, 0.5% as Sikh, 0.4% as Buddhist and 0.1% as Jewish (Northampton Hebrew Congregation). 6.5% declined to report any affiliation.

Religion	2001		2011		2021	
Religion	Number	%	Number	%	Number	%
Holds religious beliefs	141,432	72.7%	135,433	63.9%	137,892	57.8%
Christian	132,791	68.3%	119,937	56.6%	116,119	48.7%
Buddhist	669	0.3%	924	0.4%	896	0.4%
Hindu	2,228	1.1%	3,393	1.6%	4,510	1.9%
Jewish	322	0.2%	273	0.1%	224	0.1%
Muslim	4,028	2.1%	8,806	4.2%	13,350	5.6%
Sikh	736	0.4%	1,063	0.5%	1,292	0.5%
Other religion	658	0.3%	1,037	0.5%	1,501	0.6%
(No religion and Religion not stated)	53,026	27.3	76,636	36.1%	100,774	42.2%
No religion	37,132	19.1%	62,404	29.4%	85,273	35.7%
Religion not stated	15,894	8.2%	14,232	6.7%	15,501	6.5%
Total population	194,458	100%	212,069	100%	238,666	100%

== Economy ==
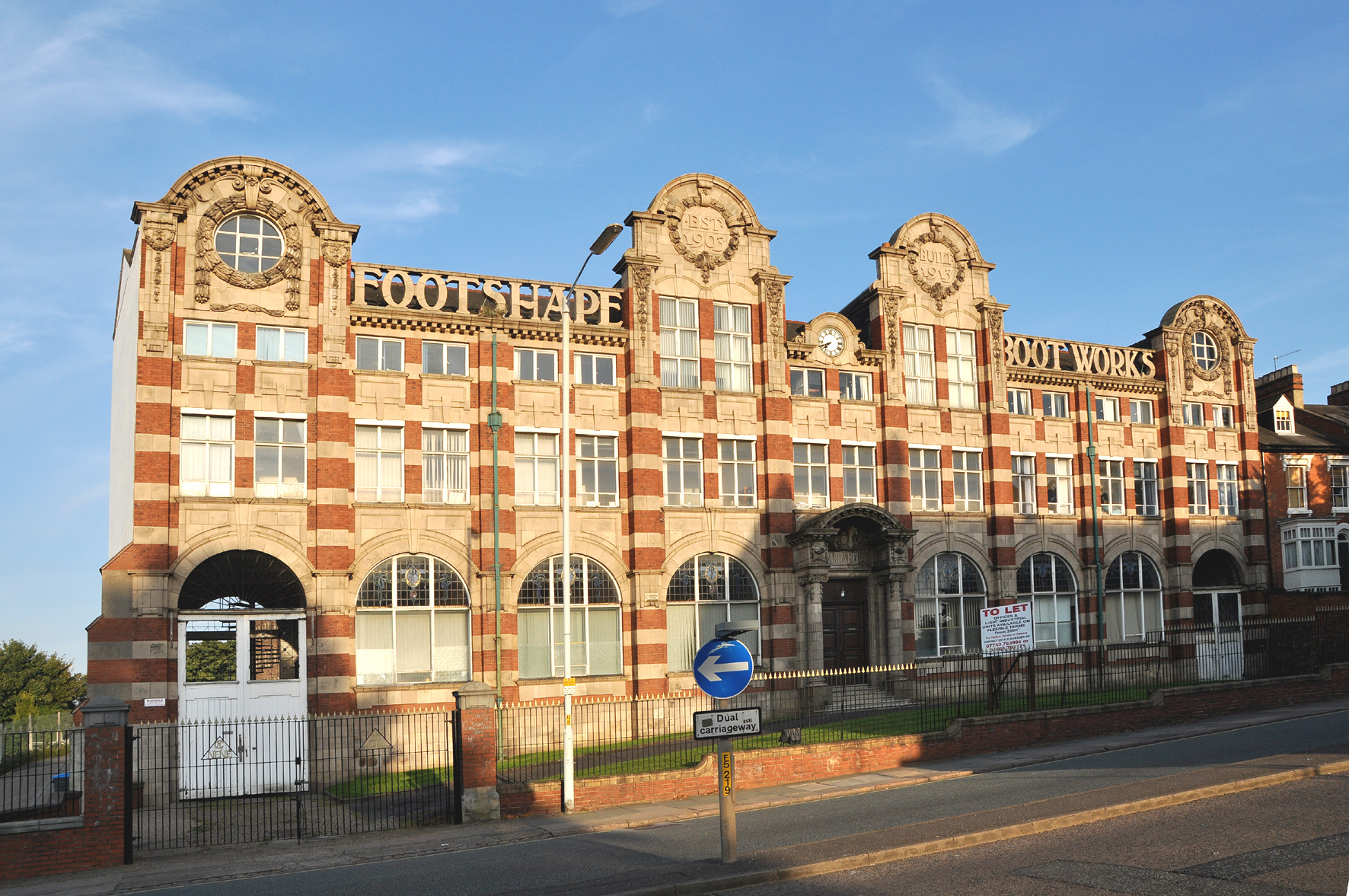
The former Barratt Boot and Shoe factory.

Northampton was a major centre of shoemaking and other leather industries, although only specialist shoemaking companies such as Barker Shoes, Church's, Crockett & Jones, Edward Green, Tricker's, (formerly located in nearby Earls Barton), and Wildsmith, survive. A large number of old shoe factories remain, mostly now converted to offices or accommodation, some of which are surrounded by terraced houses built for factory workers.

Engineering became a major employer in Northampton during the post-war years, following the establishment of the British Timken tapered roller bearing factory at Duston in 1941 as a shadow factory for the main site in Birmingham during the Second World War. The factory, which closed in 2002, employed over 4,000 employees at its peak and was a major engineering apprentice training employer.

Northampton's main private-sector employers are now in distribution and finance, rather than manufacturing, and include Avon Products, Barclaycard, Blacks Leisure Group, Nationwide Building Society (Anglia Building Society was formed by amalgamation of Northampton Town and County Building Society with Leicestershire Building Society in 1966 and subsequently merged with the Nationwide in 1987), Panasonic, Travis Perkins, Coca-Cola, Schweppes, Simply Business, National Grid, Texas Instruments and Carlsberg. In 1974, Princess Benedikte of Denmark opened Northampton's Carlsberg brewery, the first outside Denmark. The University of Northampton is also a major employer, as is St Andrew's Healthcare, a national mental health charity. St Andrew's Hospital, its flagship hospital and the United Kingdom's largest psychiatric hospital, is based in Northampton. In 2014, Experian named Northampton as "the best place in the UK to start and run a business." In 2017, the town's annual economic output, as measured by gross value added, was worth £7.31 billion.

The town was expected to be affected by the insolvency of Northamptonshire County Council in 2018, as the council implemented significant budget cuts for two years. That was expected to include maintenance of only the "bare legal minimum of service, focused only on the most vulnerable residents."

Health inequality in Northampton is high, with the life expectancy gap between the least deprived and most deprived men reaching over a decade. Additionally, the constituency is 'considerably worse than [the] England average' in violent crime, self-harm, under-18 conception and GCSE achievement.

Northampton's market square is one of Britain's largest and dates back to 1235. The market square is linked to Abington Street, a major shopping area of Northampton. The western part of the street was pedestrianised in 1984. Further east, part was pedestrianised in 1995 and depedestrianised in 2014. The east end (beyond York Road) has never been pedestrianised. There are also two indoor shopping centres in the town centre: the Grosvenor Centre, which was built in the 1970s, and Market Walk (previously Peacock Place), which was constructed in 1988. St James Retail Park is also a large shopping precinct just south of the town centre. Other out-of-town retail parks exist: Weston Favell Shopping Centre, built in the 1970s, and Riverside Retail Park in the east of the town, as well as Sixfields in the west. Each precinct has a range of high street shops and many smaller individual speciality shops.

== Transport ==
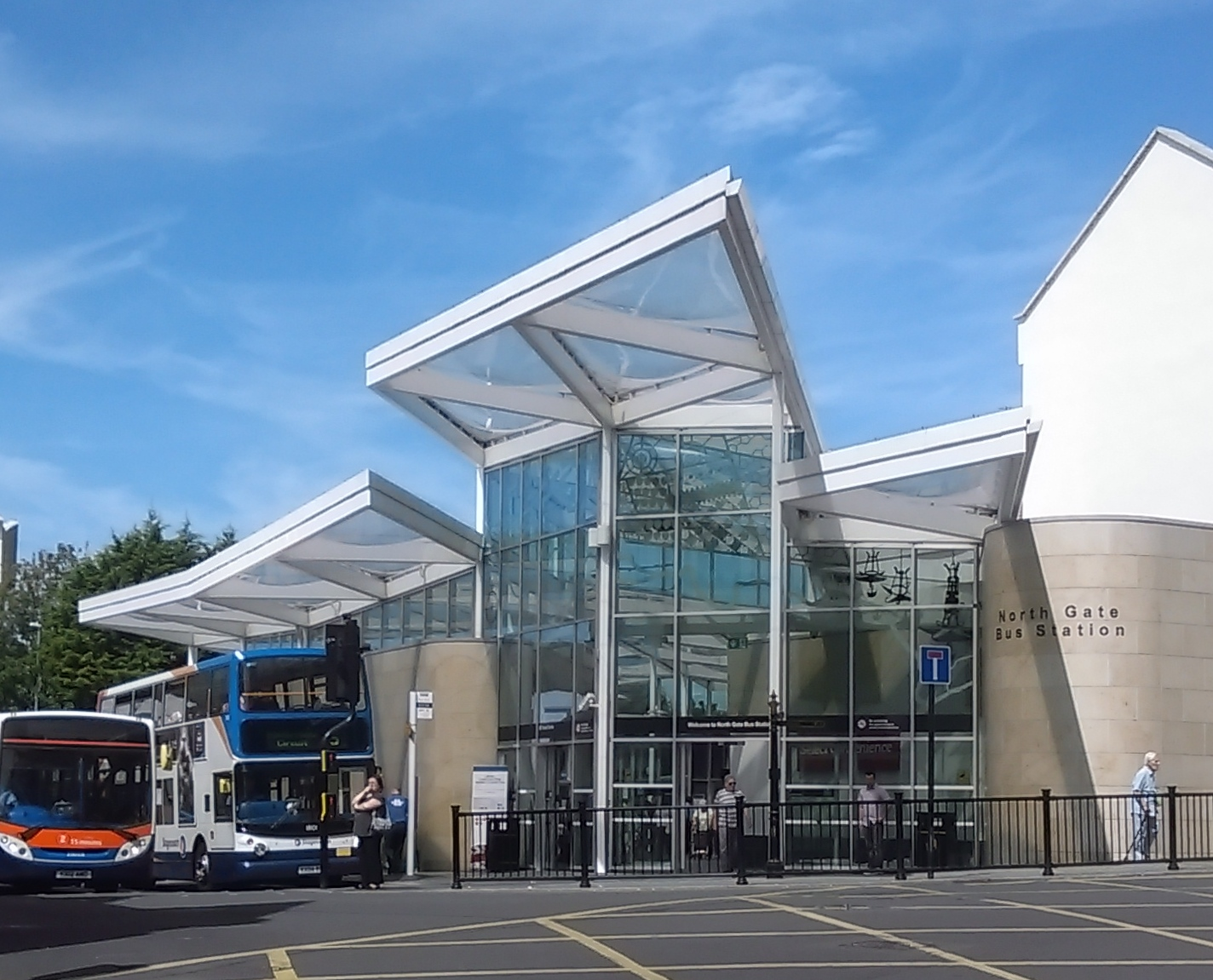
North Gate bus station

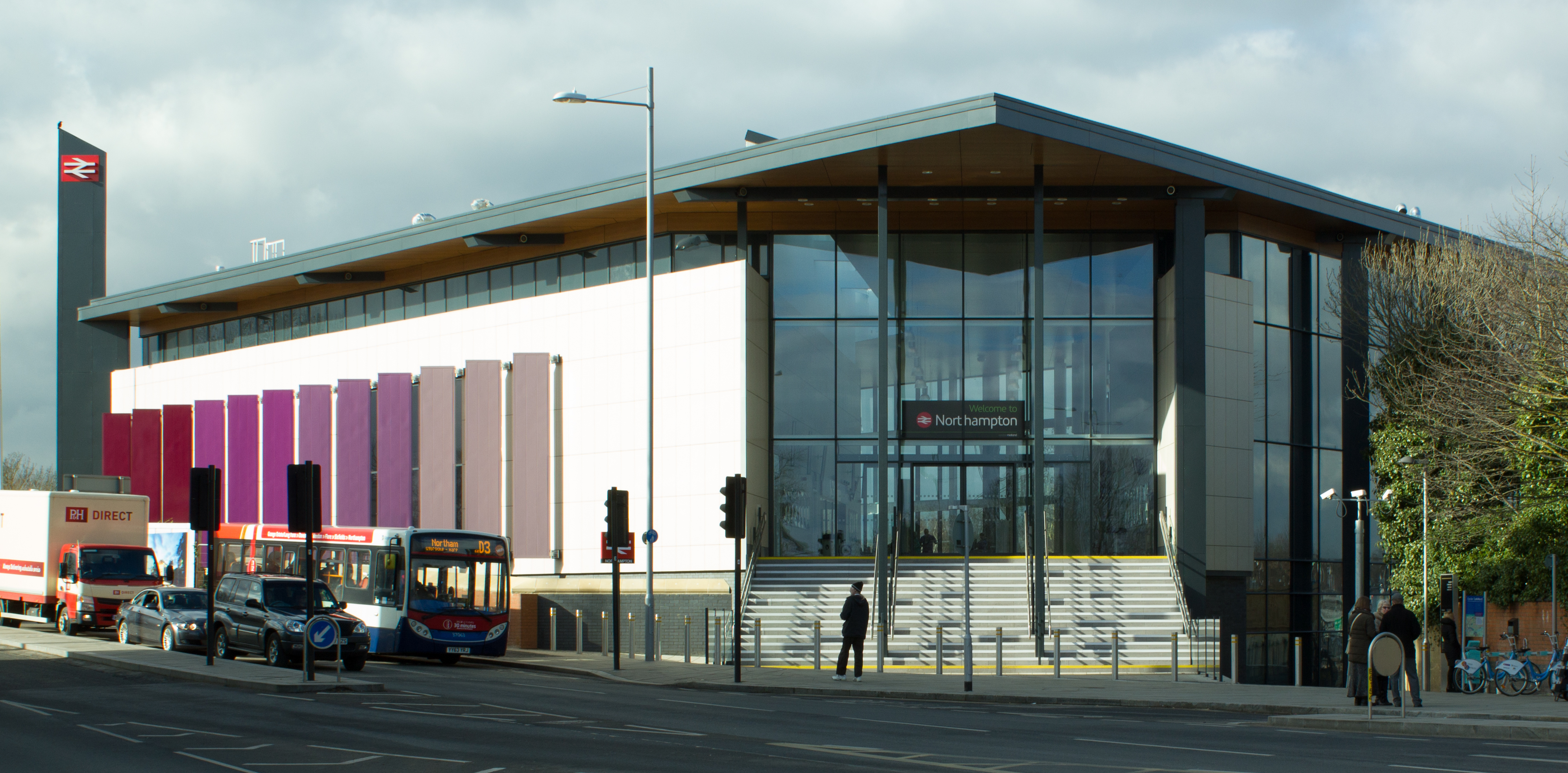
Northampton railway station

=== Railway ===
Northampton railway station is a stop on the Northampton Loop of the West Coast Main Line. London Northwestern Railway operates services southbound to London Euston and northbound to Birmingham New Street and Crewe.

=== Roads ===
Northampton is served by junctions 15, 15a and 16 of the M1 motorway, which connects London with Leeds. Both the A45 and A43 link the town with the other major towns in Northamptonshire and beyond, and can be accessed by a partially completed ring road. The A14 is close by to the north of Northampton, providing links to East Anglia and a secondary route to the areas of the Midlands which are situated to the north of the town.

=== Buses and coaches ===
Bus services are operated predominantly by Stagecoach Midlands from the North Gate bus station. It serves areas within the town and also provides travel to outlying villages and towns within the county, including Corby, Daventry, Kettering, Rushden and Wellingborough. Further afield, routes connect the town with Bedford, Leicester, Market Harborough, Peterborough, Milton Keynes and Rugby. Arriva Herts & Essex also operate two services to Milton Keynes.

National Express and Flixbus also operate in Northampton, covering routes to London, Birmingham, Coventry, Derby, Glasgow, Luton Airport, Leeds, Nottingham and Sheffield.

Buses were historically operated by Northampton Corporation Transport, until privatisation in the 1980s.

=== Other transport ===
Sywell Aerodrome is the nearest airfield, which has recently been upgraded with a 1,000-metre-long (3,300 ft) concrete runway; however, it only caters for private flying, flight training and corporate flights. For international links, East Midlands Airport and Luton Airport are quickly accessible by the M1 around 44 miles (71 km) north-west and 33 miles (53 km) south-east, respectively; Birmingham Airport is also around 39 miles (63 km) to the north-west of the town via the M1 and M6 motorways, as well as by train.

Northampton is the terminus of an arm of the Grand Union Canal, which connects to the River Nene and from that to the river Great Ouse and the North Sea. No longer used for freight, the waterway is now popular with anglers and narrowboaters. Principal outlying villages on the canal include Gayton, Blisworth, Braunston and Stoke Bruerne.

The town once had a horse-drawn tramway which opened in 1881. The system was extended in stages and taken over by the council in 1897 and named Northampton Corporation Tramways. It was electrified in 1904, but closed in 1934 mainly as a result of competition from motor buses which were introduced in 1929. Two of the original tram shelters are preserved: one at the Racecourse Park and another in Kingsthorpe opposite the Cock Hotel.

== Education ==
The first University of Northampton was established by royal charter by King Henry III in 1261, and started to rival the universities in Cambridge and Oxford, with their students migrating to the Northampton establishment. This university was dissolved by King Henry III in 1265, in revenge for its students siding with the rebellious barons in the Battle of Northampton (1264). Henry III was also advised by bishops and magnates that it posed a threat to Oxford, and signed a Royal Decree which banned the establishment of a university in Northampton.

This was eventually repealed and the university's name was revived in 2005, when the unconnected University College Northampton, founded in 1924, was upgraded to full university status and renamed the University of Northampton. This is the only higher education establishment in the town and offers courses from foundation and undergraduate levels to postgraduate, professional and doctoral qualifications. The university is made of up six schools: Business, Education, Health, Science and Technology, Social Sciences, and The Arts. The university was originally spread over two campuses across the town, but moved to its new £330 million waterside campus by the River Nene in the town centre in 2018.

Northampton's only further education (FE) college is Northampton College, one of the largest FE colleges in the South Midlands, which has two campuses across the town, offering vocational courses, GCSEs and A Levels. Moulton College is another FE college just north of Northampton, which provides many vocational courses, specialising in land-based subjects, sports and construction. In collaboration with the University of Northampton, both colleges also offer some HE programmes.

There are 50 primary schools and eight secondary schools in the town. Until 2004, Northamptonshire operated a three-tier system in education of lower, middle and upper schools. In 2001, the move to a two-tier system to primary and secondary schools began, aimed at improving educational standards. Some of its successful secondary schools include Northampton School for Boys, which became the top performing comprehensive school in the country in 2007, and Northampton School for Girls, the first school in England to gain Specialist Music College status. An average of 55% of students in Northampton achieved five A*-C grades at GCSE in 2015, above the government's benchmark of 40%. There are also five special schools in the town. Northampton High School is an independent school for girls.

== Culture ==
=== Leisure ===
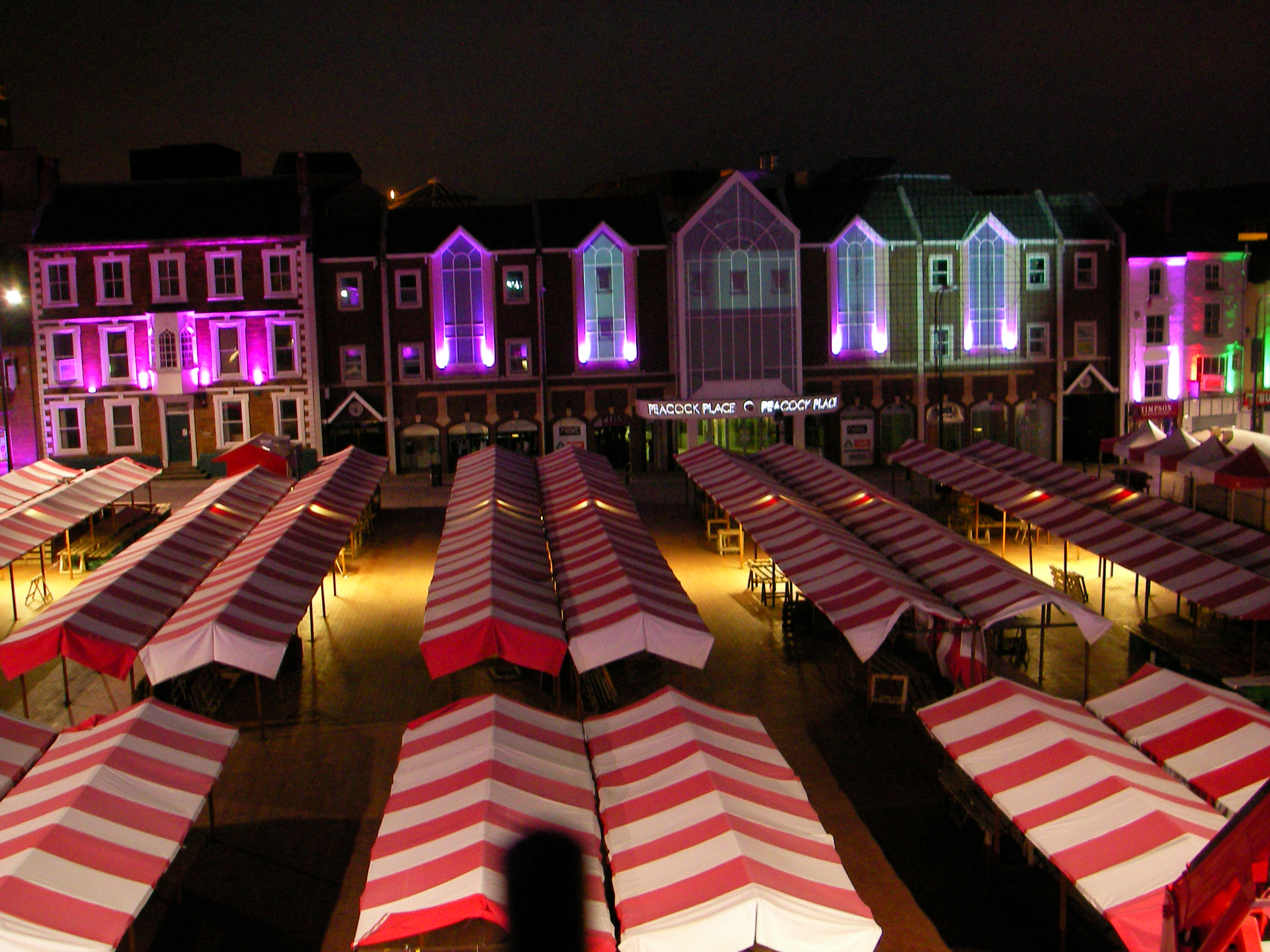
The Market Square at night

Billing Aquadrome leisure park is on the eastern outskirts. The Northampton Leisure Trust (branded Trilogy Leisure) has four leisure centres across Northampton, including Mounts Baths.

There are a total of 170 parks and open spaces around Northampton, which altogether span around 1,880 acres (761 ha). Popular parks include Abington Park.

Annual events include Northampton Carnival, the Beer Festival, the Dragonboat Race and Diwali celebrations. Northampton Music Festival has been celebrated every year since 2007 in the town centre.

=== Entertainment ===
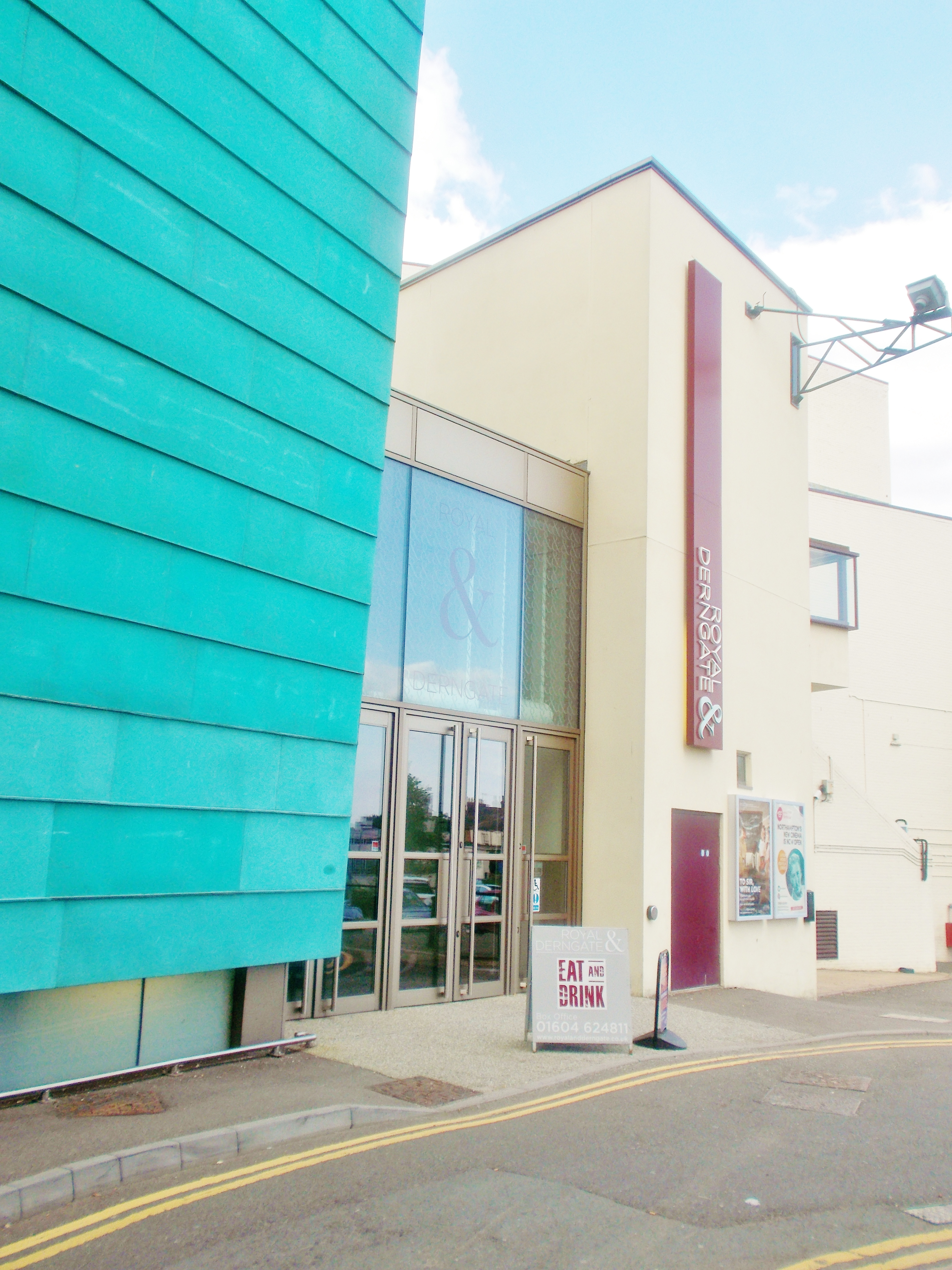
Royal & Derngate, one of the main venues for arts and entertainment

The Royal & Derngate theatre complex, on Guildhall Road in the Cultural Quarter of the town centre, is one of the main venues for arts and entertainment in Northampton. The Deco, situated in Abington Square in the town centre, is a 900-seat theatre and conference centre, which shares its Art Deco building with the Northampton Jesus Centre. It was restored by the Jesus Army as part of their Jesus Centre project. The Deco used to be a cinema in the 1960s; the Beatles appeared there twice on stage in 1963, firstly as unknowns as part of the Tommy Roe/Chris Montez tour, and secondly as part of their own tour in their own right. Smaller theatres include the Northampton Playhouse and the Cripps Theatre, which is part of Northampton School for Boys.

The two commercial cinemas in Northampton are Vue at Sol Central in the centre and Odeon at Sixfields. There is also the subsidised Forum Cinema at Lings Forum, whose film programme is widely varied and includes art-house and non-mainstream films. The Northampton Filmhouse, an independent cinema joined to the side of the Royal & Derngate theatre complex, opened in June 2013.

There are also many local entertainment venues which provide events. The Roadmender, which used to be run and funded by the council and later bought by The Purplehaus group, hosts mainstream touring bands and one-off gigs. There are other popular late-night entertainment venues, pubs, bars and clubs in the town centre, and along the Wellingborough and Kettering Roads on the way into the town centre. Northampton also has ten-pin bowling alleys and late night casinos.

=== Libraries, museums and galleries ===
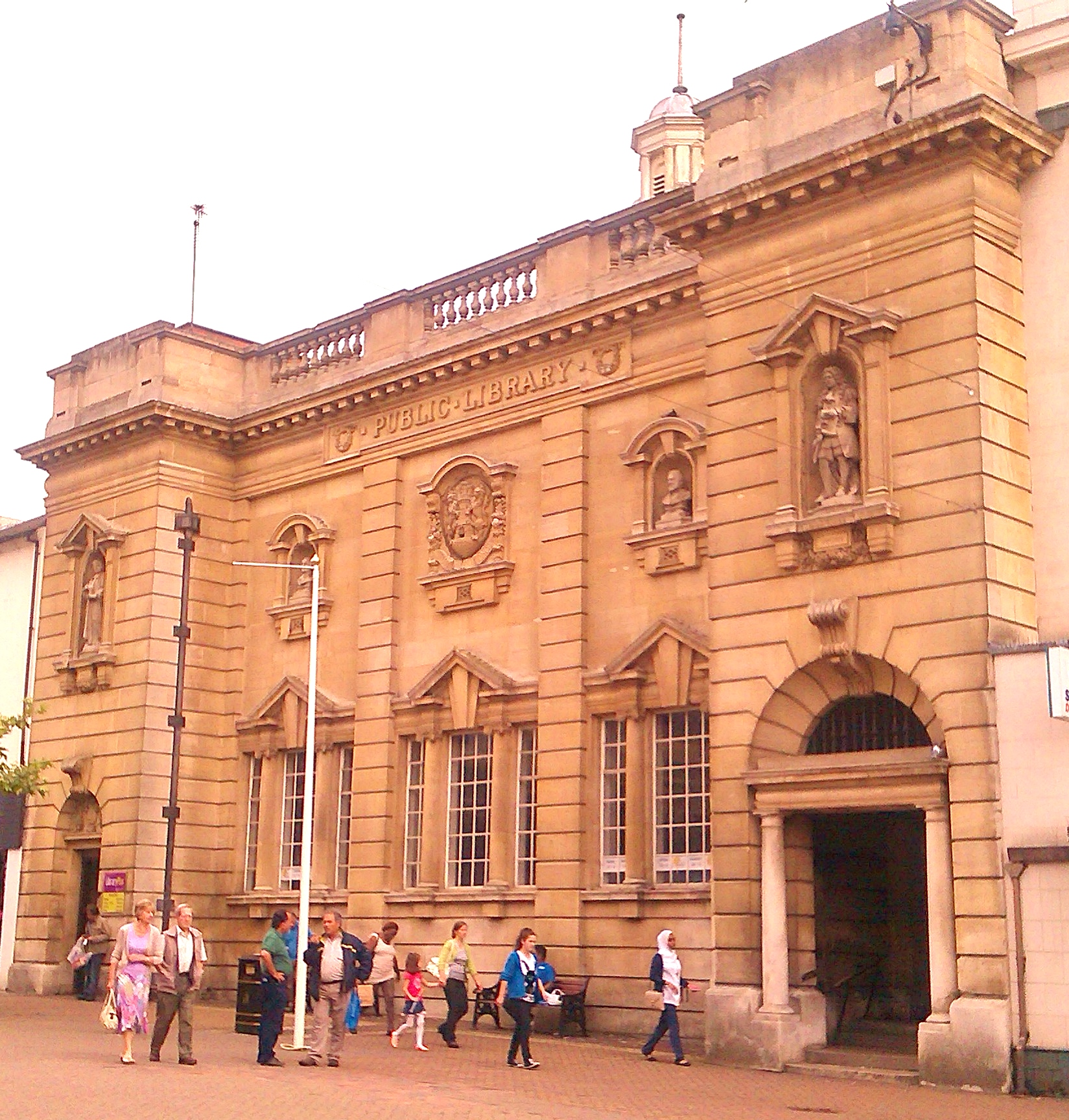
Northamptonshire Central Library in Abington Street

The Northamptonshire Central Library in town centre is a Grade II listed building which was erected in 1910. There are seven other public libraries that are dotted across Northampton—in Abington, Duston, Hunsbury, Kingsthorpe, St James, Weston Favell and Wootton—with Abington, Kingsthorpe, St James and Wootton being community managed libraries, and the rest managed by West Northamptonshire council.

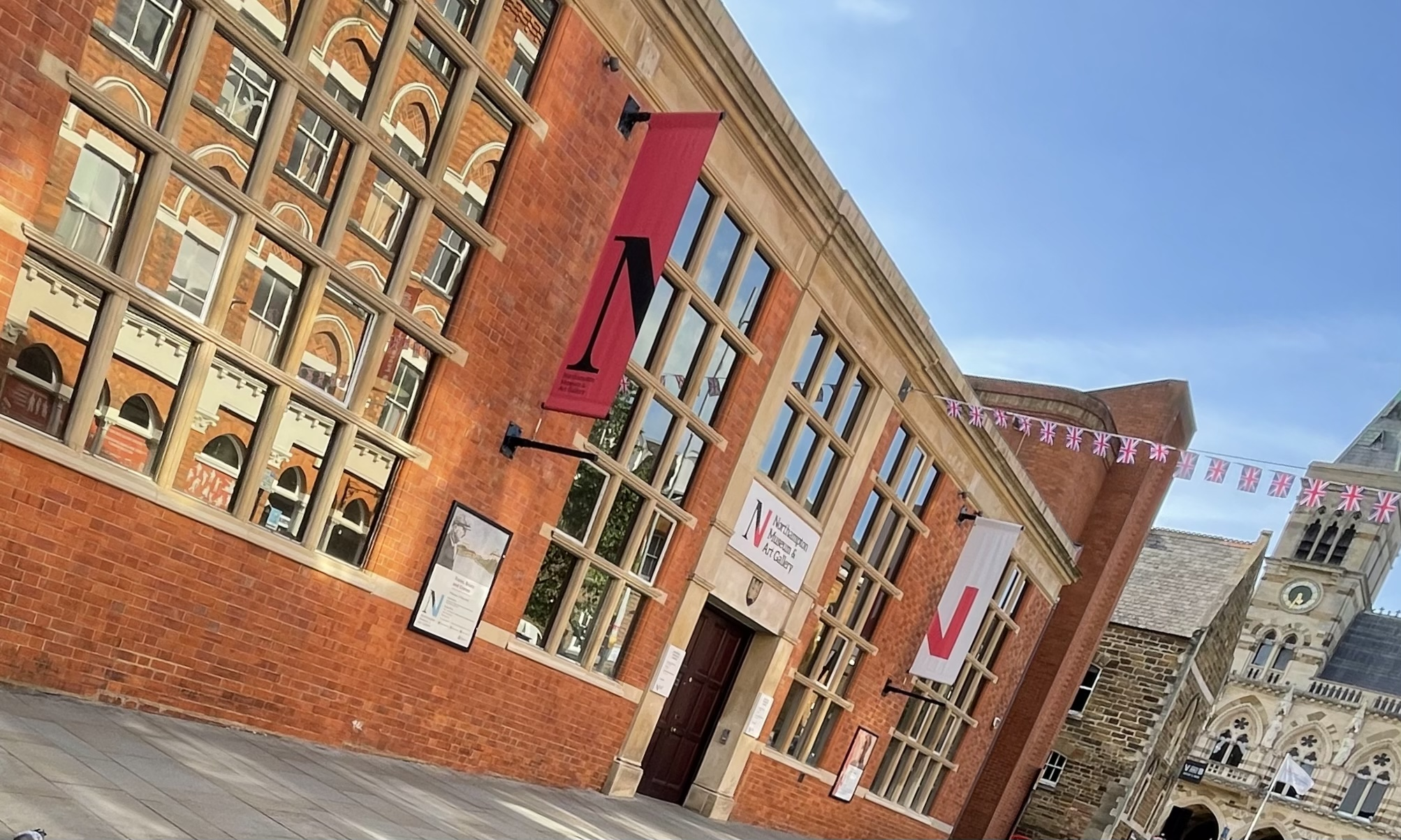
Northampton Museum and Art Gallery

Northampton Museum and Art Gallery on Guildhall Road in the Cultural Quarter has a collection of historical footwear (one of the world's largest at 13,000), Italian art, glass and ceramics, plus visiting exhibitions and local history. There is also a smaller Grade I listed historical museum in the former Abington Park house which mainly has history on domestic life in the town and the Northamptonshire Regiment. 78 Derngate, the only house in England designed by Charles Rennie Mackintosh, includes a museum celebrating Mackintosh, an art gallery and a restaurant.

The Northampton Arts Collective is homed on a four-storey building entitled NN in the Cultural Quarter, opposite the Northampton Museum and next to the Royal & Derngate theatre complex. It relocated from the Old Fishmarket, which was demolished to make way for the North Gate bus station. The Avenue Gallery, is at the Avenue campus of the University of Northampton. The university also spent £3 million on its Portfolio Innovation Centre in early 2011, which houses around 60 creative freelancers, digital media developers, and designers. Other art galleries include Collective Collaborations, Artist's Sanctuary, Albus3, Gallery 177 and Primose Gallery. Northamptonshire also runs an annual county-wide Open Studios event celebrating visual arts in which artists' studios are open to the public.

Abington Park Museum is located in Abington Park. The museum building was donated with the parkland in 1897 and the museum opened in 1899. It had a wide ranging collection of objects from the UK, Africa and Asia. Today, it is part of the Northampton Museums.

=== Music ===
The composers Malcolm Arnold, William Alwyn, Trevor Hold, Edmund Rubbra and Robert Walker were born in Northampton. Northampton also has one of the oldest community orchestras in the UK – the Northampton Symphony Orchestra, which started life in 1896 as Saint Celia's Orchestral Society. Indie rock band The Departure, as well as Gothic rock band Bauhaus formed in Northampton, the latter often cited as the godfathers of goth, helped pioneer the genre during the late 1970s and throughout the 1980s. Spinoff bands Love and Rockets, as well as Tones on Tail were also formed in the town. Drum and bass group Foul Play formed in the town, and would play a major role in the transition from breakbeat hardcore to jungle in the early 1990s. The UK rapper Slowthai was born in Northampton and frequently talks about his life growing up there in his music. Pop musician Sophie was also born in the town. Both Dominic Major, drummer of London Grammar, and Adrian Utley, guitarist of Portishead, originate from the town.

== Media ==
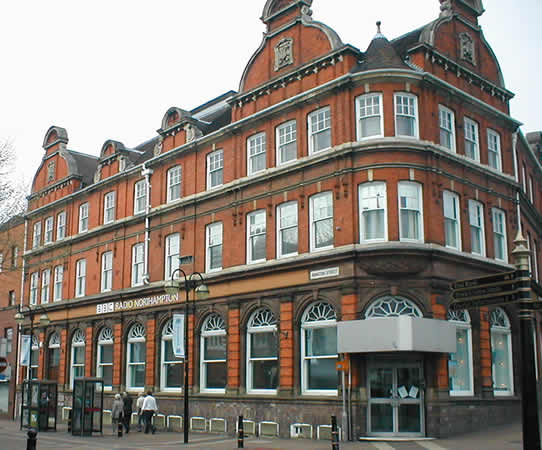
Radio Northampton's Broadcasting House is located on Abington Street

Heart and BBC Radio Northampton are the major stations that serve the town. There are four community radio stations: Inspiration FM, NLive Radio (formerly NNBC), Revolution Radio and Embrace Radio. Revolution Radio was awarded a five year licence on 16 July 2020. Inspiration FM was officially launched in July 2010. The station broadcasts on 107.8 FM.

The Northampton Chronicle & Echo (established 1931) is the town's newspaper, published on Thursdays (before 2012, it was published Monday to Saturday) with jobs, property, motors and entertainment supplements. There are other free newspapers circulated within the town. These include The Mercury (on Thursdays) and Northants on Sunday, both from the publishers of the Chronicle & Echo, and the Northampton Herald & Post (on Thursdays). These free papers mostly consist of advertising and have limited news. The Mercury was one of the oldest newspapers still in circulation first published in 1720, founded by William Dicey, an ancestor of the public law commentator, A.V. Dicey. It was the fifth-oldest such newspaper in the United Kingdom and the tenth-oldest such in the world.

NNBC was originally launched in September 2016, as a joint venture with the University of Northampton. In 2017, the station was rebranded as NLive Radio along with a live broadcast from Market Square on 30 September. Later that same evening, the station ran a live evening of music from a music venue in Northampton. The evening of music was headlined by Hana Brooks and broadcast live on the station under the banner 'Shoetown Sounds'. Embrace Radio, Revolution Radio and Inspiration FM serve the town on the local DAB service.

Regional TV news is provided by BBC Look East and ITV News Anglia.

== Sport ==
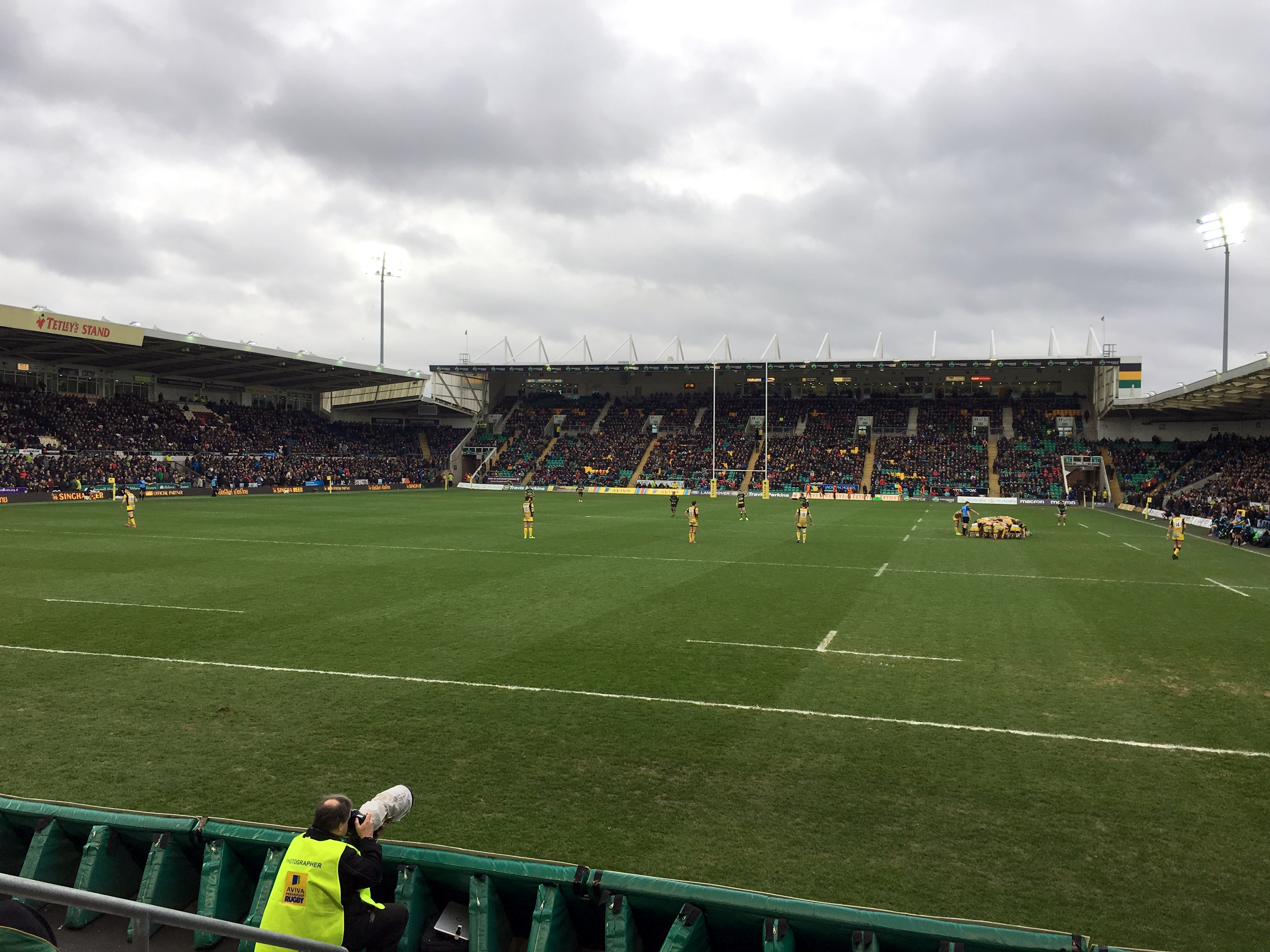
Franklin's Gardens, the home of the Saints, is the fifth largest stadium in the East Midlands and the largest stadium in Northamptonshire

=== Rugby union ===
The town is home to 2023-2024 Premiership rugby union champions Northampton Saints, which plays at Franklin's Gardens in the St James End area to the west of town. The Saints have won three major titles so far: the Heineken Cup in 2000, and the English Premiership twice in 2014 and 2024 respectively; it has the highest average attendance of any professional sports team in the town.

Rugby union also maintains itself as a very popular amateur sport in the town, with it being played by nearly every secondary school in the area, as well as by around ten amateur clubs within Northampton itself, most of which field multiple teams on weekends. Northampton is also home to Northampton Outlaws, its first inclusive rugby team. Due to its introduction to the town as a sport for all, it has maintained a considerably more working class character than elsewhere in the UK.

=== Football ===
EFL League Two football club Northampton Town, known as "The Cobblers" from the town's shoemaking background, are based at Sixfields Stadium. Established in 1897, in their centenary season of 1997 they reached Wembley through the play-offs and beat Swansea City 1–0 with an injury time winning free kick from John Frain. It was the first club to set up a trust for supporters to work with the club as many have done. Sixfields was also briefly the home of Coventry City for just over one season between August 2013 and August 2014.

There are also three non-league clubs in the United Counties Football League: Northampton Spencer, Northampton Sileby Rangers and Northampton Old Northamptonian Chenecks.

=== Cricket ===
Northamptonshire County Cricket Club, known in limited overs cricket as "The Steelbacks" (a reference to the Northamptonshire Regiment which was formed in 1881), is one of the 18 major county clubs which make up the English and Welsh domestic cricket structure. The club was promoted from Division Two of the County Championship in 2019 but have since been relegated, and play in Group C of the Clydesdale Bank 40 League and the Midlands/Wales/West group of the revamped Friends Provident T20. They are based at the County Ground, in the Abington area.

=== Motorsport ===
The Silverstone Circuit, current home of the British Grand Prix, is a few miles south of the town.

Northampton International Shaleway, Brafield-on-the-Green, 6-miles east of Northampton, is used for BriSCA F1 Stock Cars, BriSCA Formula 2 Stock Cars, V8 Hotstox, and various other forms of oval motor sport including National Hot Rods, Banger racing, Saloon Stock Cars, Ministox and Rebels. Speedway Racing will return to the Stadium for the first time since 1967, when a new Northampton team joins the Speedway SGB Premiership for the 2026 season, with the opening meeting on Thursday, 30 April 2026.

Santa Pod Raceway15 miles east of Northampton, offers a range of drag racing events. Rockingham Motor Speedway a large, banked, car oval, near Corby, closed for racing in 2018 Three-time defending BTCC Teams' champions Alliance Racing are based in Northampton.

=== Other sport ===
Northampton is also home to Collingtree Park Golf Club, which hosted the British Masters in 1995. There are also many equestrian and country activities, and several water sports centres, such as the Nene Whitewater Centre, which provides an artificial whitewater course for canoes, kayaks and rafts. The Northampton Swimming Club also trained the young Olympic swimmer Caitlin McClatchey.

Northampton is also home to Be Military Fit in Abington Park where members can train up to 7 times a week with serving or ex-military fitness instructors.

Northampton Greyhound Stadium hosted greyhound racing from 1928 to 1964 and speedway from 1929 to 1930.

Speedway racing is set to return to Northampton for the 2026 season at Northampton International Shaleway, Brafield-on-the-Green, with the opening meeting on Thursday 30 April 2026 against King's Lynn Stars.

== Notable buildings ==
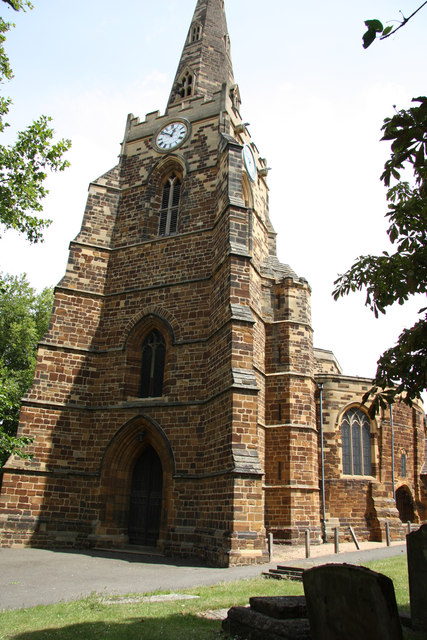
The Church of The Holy Sepulchre, Northampton

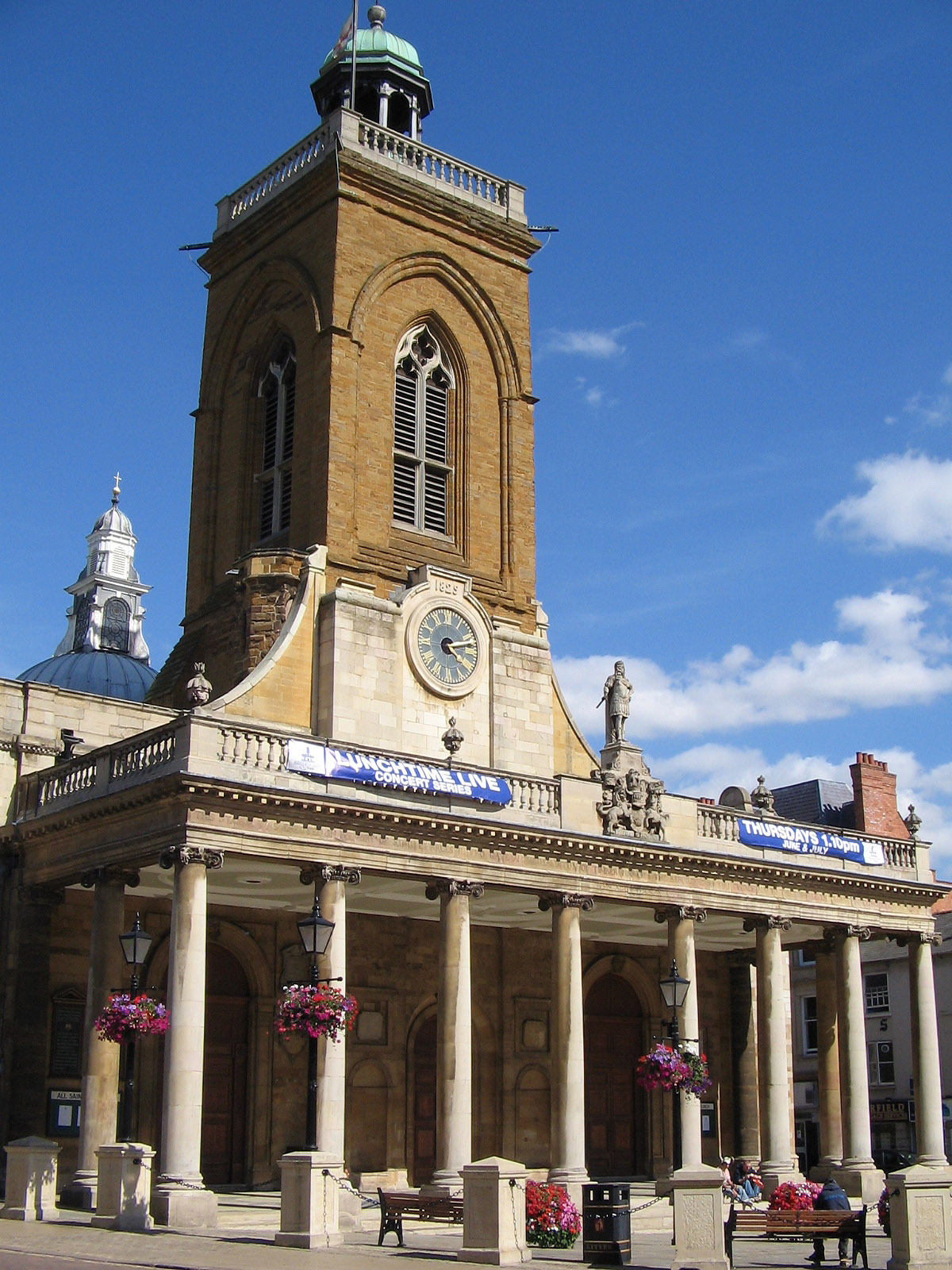
All Saints' Church in the centre of Northampton

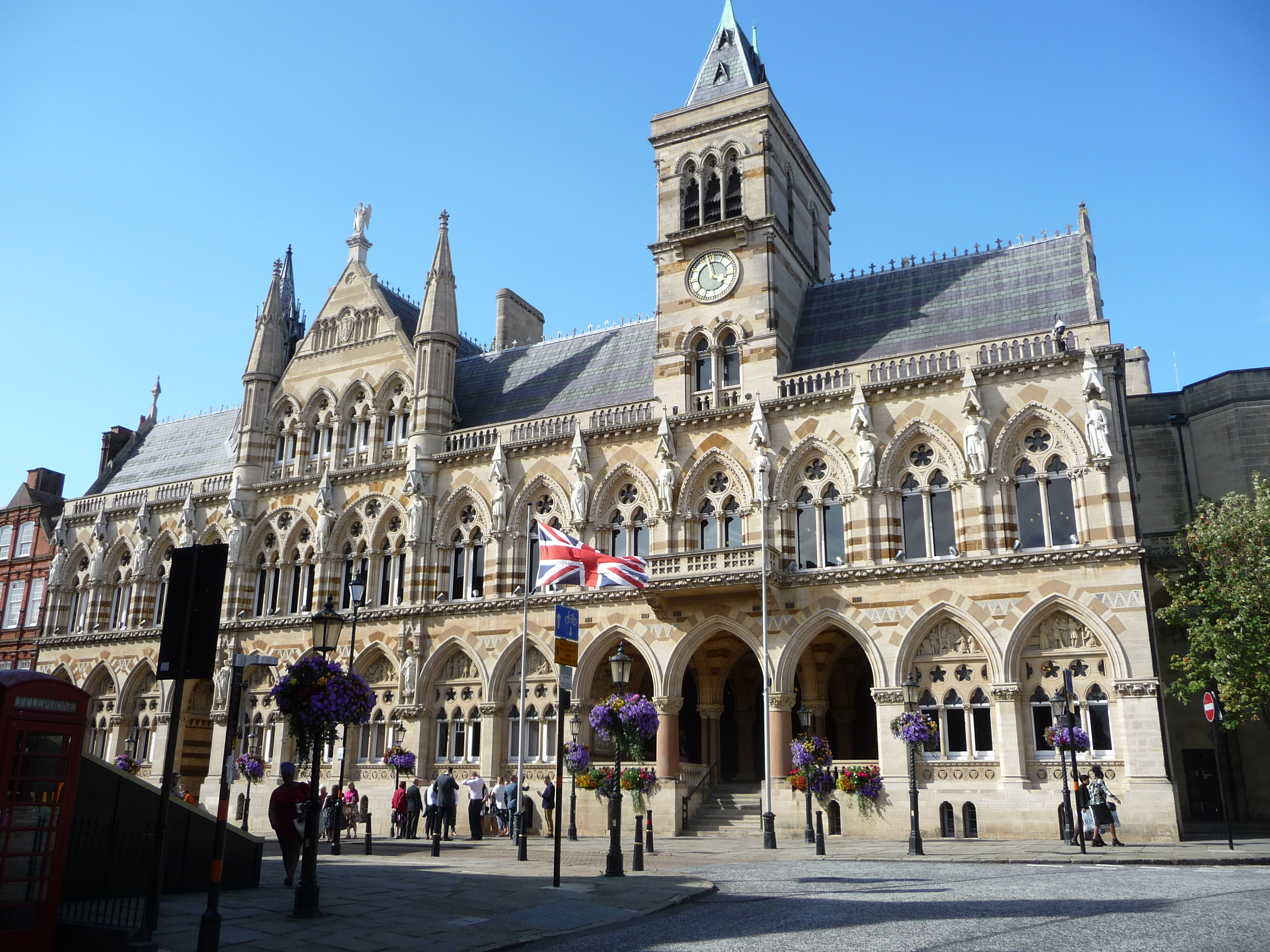
Northampton Guildhall, built in the 1860s, is a Grade II* listed building

The Church of the Holy Sepulchre is one of the largest and best-preserved round churches in England. It was built in 1100 on the orders of the first Earl of Northampton, Simon de Senlis, and based on a plan of the original Church of the Holy Sepulchre in Jerusalem.

Simon de Senlis also built Northampton Castle in c. 1084, which was one of the country's most important castles for many years. It was a royal residence, holding the Parliament of England many times, and was the site of royal tournaments and feasts. Thomas Becket was imprisoned there until he escaped. The castle suffered many fates and was eventually demolished to make way for the railway station in 1879. A postern, dismantled from its original position and rebuilt into a wall by the station, and a part of the keep mound are all that remains.

The current All Saints' Church was built on the site of a great Norman church, All Hallows', which was almost completely destroyed by the Great Fire of Northampton in 1675. All that remained was the medieval tower and the fine vaulted crypt; by 1680, All Saints' had been rebuilt, with the help of donations from all over England, including 1,000 tons of timber from King Charles II, whose statue can be seen above the portico. Famously, the poet John Clare liked to sit beneath the portico of the church. It is home to a choral foundation.

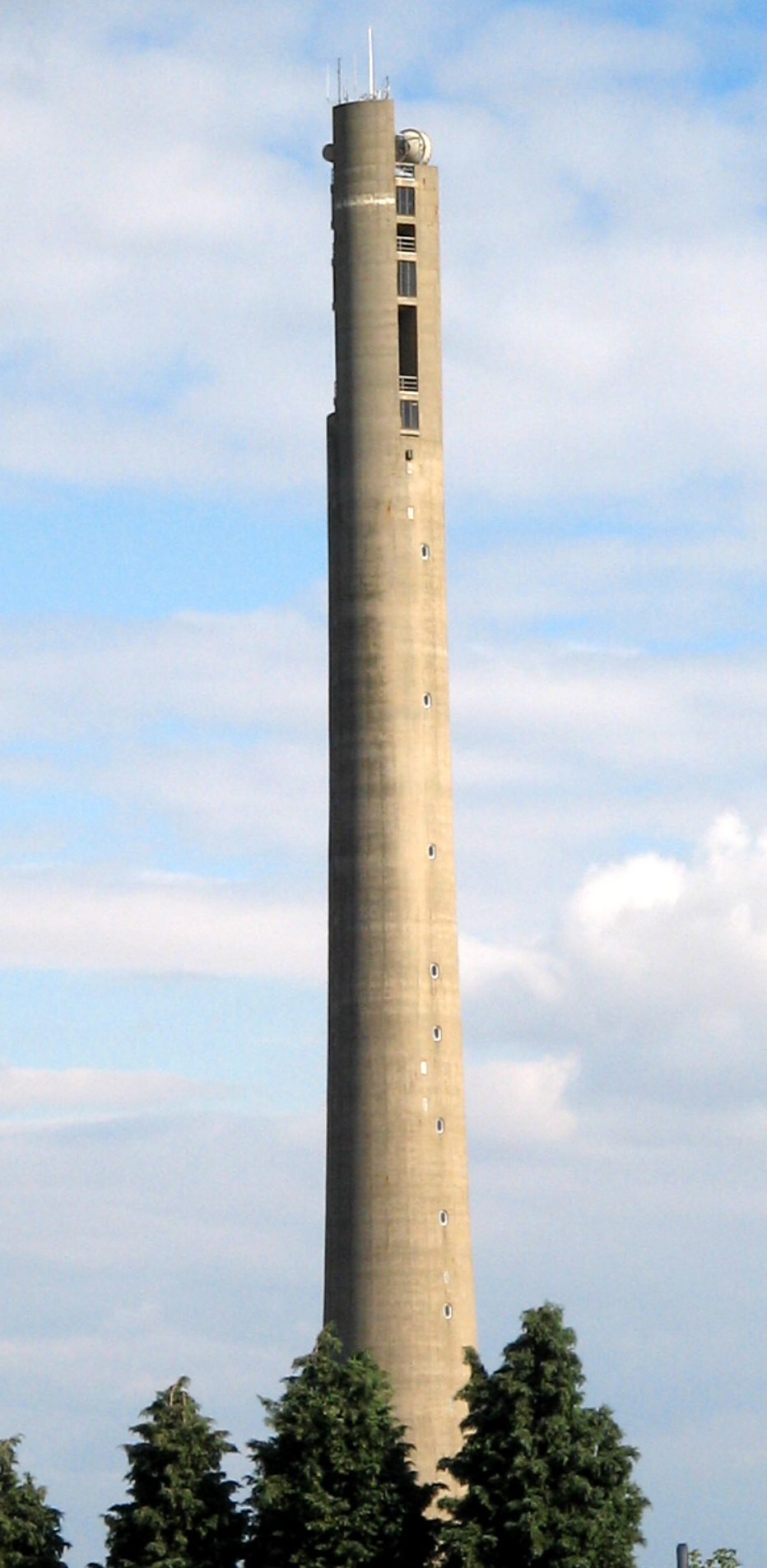
The National Lift Tower is a prominent feature of the town's skyline

Other notable church buildings include Northampton Cathedral, the mother church of the Roman Catholic Diocese of Northampton and seat of the Bishop of Northampton; St Peter's (mostly built in Norman times); St Giles' Church; St Matthew's in Phippsville, which was built between 1891 and 1894, has a Henry Moore sculpture of the Madonna. St Edmund's Church (built in 1850) closed in 1978 and was demolished in 1980 (its bells are now in Saint Paul's Cathedral, Wellington).

Medieval Northampton had ten parish churches and at least three chapels: the aforementioned All Saints', St Peter's, Holy Sepulchre and St Giles' (which four still exist), plus St Bartholomew's, St Edmund's, St Gregory's, St Margaret's, St Mary's and St Michael's. These six latter churches, along with the three chapels of St Katherine's, St Martin's and St Thomas's, were all closed between the 14th and 16th centuries.

There are twelve other medieval churches within the modern-day metropolitan area - that is, in villages now swallowed up by the town. These are at Abington (SS Peter & Paul's), Collingtree (St Columba's), Dallington (St Mary's), Duston (St Luke's), Great Billing (St Andrew's), Hardingstone (St Edmund's), Kingsthorpe (St John the Baptist's), Little Billing (All Saints'), Moulton (SS Peter & Paul's), Upton (St Michael's), Weston Favell (St Peter's) and Wootton (St George's). Kingsthorpe and Upton were chapelries to St Peter's, Northampton until 1850; the others were parochial.

The expansion of the town from the 19th century onwards led to the building of numerous other Anglican churches: St Katherine's (1839), St Andrew's (1841), St Edmund's (1850), St James's (1868), St Mary's (1875), St Lawrence's (1878), St Michael's (1882), St Crispin's (1884), St Barnabas' Duston (1887), St Paul's (1890), St Matthew's (1893), St Gabriel's (1894), Christ Church (1906), Holy Trinity (1910), St Alban's (1938), St David's (1940), St Augustine's (1950s), St Mark's (1960), St Francis' (1967), Emmanuel (1974), and St Benedict's (1982), plus building-less churches in Boothville, Rectory Farm, Grange Park and Upton. Of these St Andrew's, St Augustine's, St Barnabas', St Crispin's, St Edmund's, St Gabriel's, St Katherine's, and St Paul's have closed; the others are still holding services.

Just south of the town centre is Delapré Abbey, a former Cluniac nunnery, the County Records Office and site of the second Battle of Northampton, which was founded by Simon II de Senlis, the son of first Earl of Northampton, in 1145. At the edge of the Abbey, one of the three standing Eleanor crosses still remains, in memory of Eleanor of Castile, whose body rested here on its way to London. The original top of the monument has been knocked off and replaced several times from as early as 1460.

St Andrew's Hospital, which opened 1838, and its new building William Wake House, is one of the largest neo-classical structures in England. Northampton & County Club, which was established in 1873, was also the old county hospital before becoming a private members' club; the cellars are medieval. Northampton Guildhall, which is Grade II* listed, was constructed mostly in the 1860s in Victorian Gothic architecture designed by Edward William Godwin, and extended in 1889–92 and in the 1990s. The Clare Street drill hall was completed in 1859.

No. 78 Derngate is a Grade II* listed Georgian town house, remodelled by Charles Rennie Mackintosh for Wenman Joseph Bassett-Lowke in 1916–17. It contains notable Mackintosh interiors (which have been restored) and is his only major domestic commission outside Scotland. It is open to the public. One of these Derngate buildings was previously home to Northampton High School, an independent Northampton girls' school.

The 127.45 m (418 ft 2 in) tall National Lift Tower is a dominant feature and visible from most of the town. A Terry Wogan radio phone-in during the 1980s came up with the name "Northampton Lighthouse" as Northampton is one of the furthest places from the sea. It is also known as the "Cobblers' Needle". It was built for testing new lifts at the Express Lifts factory, now closed. Though now redundant, it is a listed building.

The former Greyfriars bus station served the town from 1976 until 2014. In the 2000s, it was featured on Channel 4's Demolition programme as the ugliest transport station in the United Kingdom and worthy of demolition. Demolition work began in March 2014, following the move of bus services to North Gate bus station. The Greyfriars was completely destroyed on 15 March 2015 by way of a controlled explosion.

=== Memorials ===
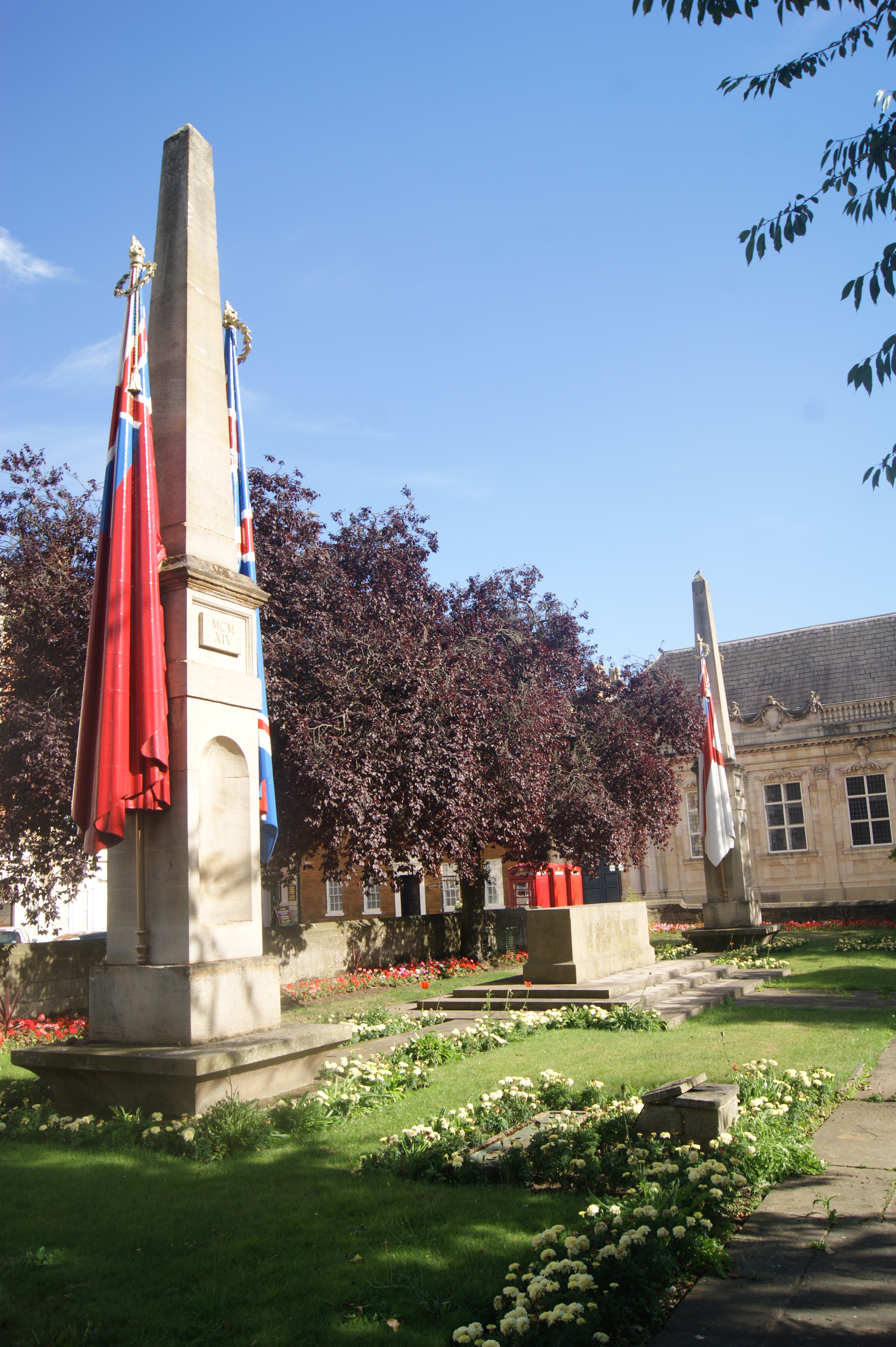
The Town and County War Memorial

Northampton contains several significant war memorials. The Town and County War Memorial, unveiled in 1926, commemorates casualties of the First World War from all of Northamptonshire; it replaced a temporary cenotaph which stood in Abington Square from 1919. Designed by Sir Edwin Lutyens, it consists of two large obelisks and an altar-like stone sited in a small garden behind All Saints' Church. The Town and County memorial is a grade I listed building and part of a national collection of Lutyens' war memorials. As the Town and County memorial does not contain a list of names of the fallen, the Royal British Legion launched a campaign which resulted in the construction of a second memorial, dedicated solely to the town; this memorial, in Abington Square, takes the form of a garden of remembrance with the names of the dead inscribed on the garden walls. A bust of Edgar Mobbs was later moved into the garden; Mobbs was a rugby player for Northampton Saints who was killed while serving in the First World War. A memorial to Nobel Prize winner Francis Crick, who was born in Northampton, and grew up in the Weston Favell area, was installed on Abington street in 2005. The sculpture, Discovery by artist Lucy Glendinning, was funded by the Wilson Foundation.

== In popular culture ==
The town has been used as a location for television, film and theatre. Northampton Castle is featured in William Shakespeare's history play King John and in Becket, a play by Alfred, Lord Tennyson. The town was the location for the BBC sitcom Keeping Up Appearances from 1990 until 1995. Parts of the 2005 film Kinky Boots were also made in Northampton and featured shots of the statue outside the Grosvenor Centre in the town centre and inside RE Tricker's shoe factory in St. Michael's Road representing the original factory in Earls Barton. The film was turned into a musical Kinky Boots, maintaining its Northampton backdrop, which premiered on Broadway in 2013 and won 6 Tony Awards. It transferred to the West End in London in 2015 and won 3 Olivier Awards.

BBC Three shows Bizarre ER and Junior Paramedics were filmed in Northampton. Changing Ends (2023), a semi-autobiographical sitcom based on Alan Carr's childhood, was set in 1980s Northampton.

== Freedom of the borough ==
The following people, military units and organisations have received the Freedom of the Borough of Northampton:

=== Individuals ===
- General Henry Horne, 1st Baron Horne: 1919.
- Diana, Princess of Wales: 8 June 1989.
- Sir Malcolm Arnold: 1989.
- Chantelle Cameron: 12 December 2023.
- Courtney Lawes: 12 December 2023.

=== Military units ===
- Northampton Unit Sea Cadet Corps: 26 March 2012.
- 9th/12th Royal Lancers: 5 November 2012.

=== Organisations and groups ===
- NHS trust Northampton: 17 June 2020.

== Twin towns ==
Northampton is twinned with:

- Marburg, Hesse, Germany
- Poitiers, Vienne, France.

== See also ==
- Districts of Northampton
- Flooding in Weedon Road, St James and Far Cotton around Easter 1998
- Grade I listed buildings in Northampton
- Grade II* listed buildings in Northampton
- HMS Laforey
- Northampton Corporation Tramways
- Royal & Derngate
- St Peter's Church, Northampton.
