= Francis Kenelm Bouverie =

English army officer (1797–1837)

Francis Kenelm Bouverie (1797–1837) was an English army officer.

== Early life ==
The third son of Edward Bouverie of Delapré Abbey, Northamptonshire and Catherine Castle, daughter and heir of William Castle (of Suffolk), he was born on 19 November 1797. He matriculated at Brasenose College, Oxford in 1816. As a result of the later deaths of his two elder brothers, Everard and Charles, without issue, the Bouverie inheritance passed through his line.

== Marriage and family ==
Francis Bouverie married Elizabeth Sheil of Castledawson, County Londonderry on 20 November 1826. They had one son, John Augustus Shiel Bouverie. Francis came to be at Castledawson as part of a detachment of his regiment, the 62nd (Wiltshire) Regiment, being stationed there. Elizabeth was said to have great personal attractions, and she claimed she possessed a fortune of £4,000. Francis had at that time only his pay and a £100 a year allowance from his father.

The wedding to Elizabeth, 10 years younger than Francis, was witnessed by his younger brother, James. For some months they lived at the house of Elizabeth's mother, but the detachment was then moved to Enniskillen. After about a year, having been promoted to the rank of captain, Francis sold his commission and settled with his wife back at Castledawson.

The marriage was not without its problems. In 1832 Elizabeth gave birth to a still-born daughter, and then in 1835 a Mr Bell persuaded her to accompany him for a ten- or twelve-day tour to Liverpool, giving rise to claim that Francis was not the father of her son James Augustus Sheil Bouverie, born the following year on 12 July 1836. While Francis had no misgivings, there was a subsequent legal battle by his son to prove his legitimacy. Despite the marriage, Bouverie remained on good terms with his family at Delapré Abbey, knowing that with his only surviving elder brother still childless, the Bouverie line could pass to him.

== Death ==
A year after his son’s birth, on 19 September 1837, Francis Bouverie died and it seems that contact was lost between his family at Delapré Abbey and Castledawson. As the son grew up, he was not aware of his possible inheritance.
