= Edward Bouverie (junior) =

English peer

- Born: 26 October 1767
- Died: 14 April 1858 (aged 90)
- Spouse: Catherine Castle (m. 1788; died 1846)
- Children: 8, including Everard
- Father: Edward Bouverie
- Relatives: Henry Bouverie (brother); Jacob Bouverie (grandfather); Everard Fawkener (grandfather)

Edward Bouverie (26 October 1767 – 14 April 1858), the eldest son of Edward Bouverie senior MP, of Delapré Abbey, Hardingstone, Northamptonshire, and Harriet Fawkener a political hostess and socialite. He married Catherine Castle, heiress and daughter of William Castle of Suffolk in March 1788. They had 4 sons and 4 daughter.

Unlike his father, and other relatives, Edward did not involve himself in national politics but instead served the local community as a Justice of the Peace, Deputy Lieutenant (18 February 1793) and High Sheriff of Northamptonshire (1800). He spent time in investing in the Delapré estate, in artwork and in horses.

== Delapré Estate ==
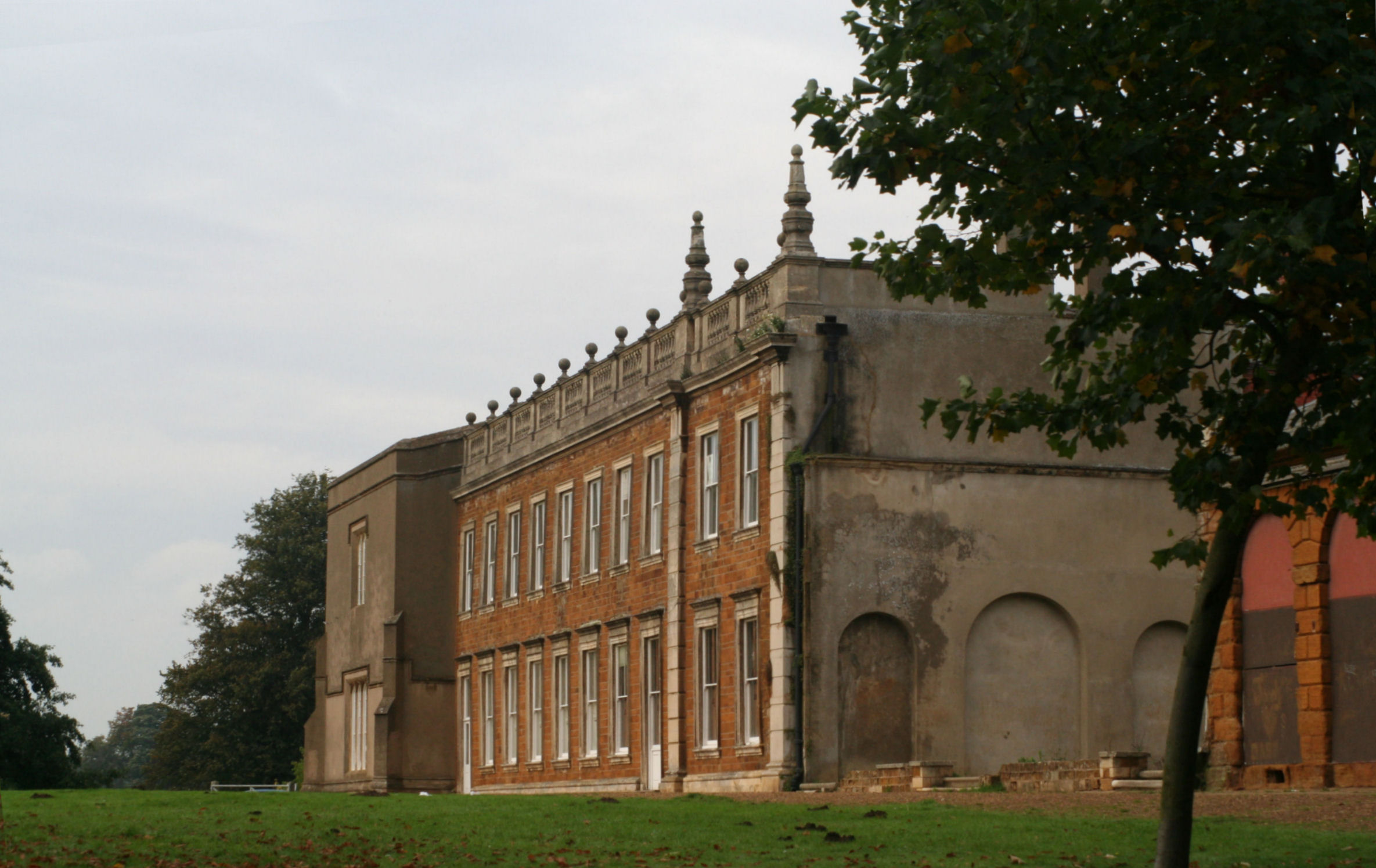
Delapré Abbey

Edward inherited Delapré on the death of his father in 1810. Helped with the inheritance of his wife, which included Rougham Hall and Wicken Hall, Edward was able to improve and extend the Delapré Estate. In 1814 Edward Bouverie purchased Weston Favell, which included the two principal farms, from the Ekins family for £23,970.

A model farm, now known as Home Farm, was built on the Delapre estate for the bailiff between 1830 and 1855. Farmstead design during this period was governed by economy of labour and buildings, together with some architectural embellishment. Home Farm followed a typical layout comprising a double quadrangle with the farmhouse at the south end, the barn at the north end, and east and west foldyards.

In 1823, after protracted negotiations Edward purchase charity lands belonging to St. Leonard's (The Leper Hospitals) and the Grammar School in Far Cotton and other lands in Northampton from Northampton Corporation for £2,500 together with £470 in interest. There were some questions over the transaction which were not finally resolved until 1864, after Edwards's death.

== Art Collector ==
As well as the portrait of "Mrs Richard Brinsley Sheridan", by Gainsborough now in the National Gallery of Art, Washington, D.C., which was probably a gift from the Sheridan's to his parents, Edward also had a portrait "Mrs. Edward Bouverie of Delapré and Her Child" by Sir Joshua Reynolds, of his mother, possibly holding himself.

Also of note was a pen & brown ink sketch by Rembrandt of "An Artist in a Studio"

Of more local interest is a watercolour painting produced in about 1850 and details the areas of Far Cotton and Delapré, as they looked at the time.

== Racehorse Owner ==
Edward's racing partner on was George Payne of nearby Sulby Hall. Edward's colours were all black, while those of his friend were all white. They amalgamated their colours, and so originated the famous 'magpie jacket.' The partner's greatest success was with War Eagle, a leggy 16.1 hand tall dark bay. He had a good turn of speed, which his jockey Sam Mann put to use in the Doncaster Cup of 1847. In 1847 War Eagle took second place in The Derby.

Fortunately for Delapré, Edward did not follow the reckless gambling of his partner who squandered the family fortune.

== Death and legacy ==
After 12 years as a widower, Catherine having died in 1846, Edward Bouverie (junior) died at the age of 90. He was succeeded by his eldest son General Everard Bouverie.
