= Sol Northampton =

Leisure complex in Northampton, England

Coordinates: 52.237°N 0.902°W

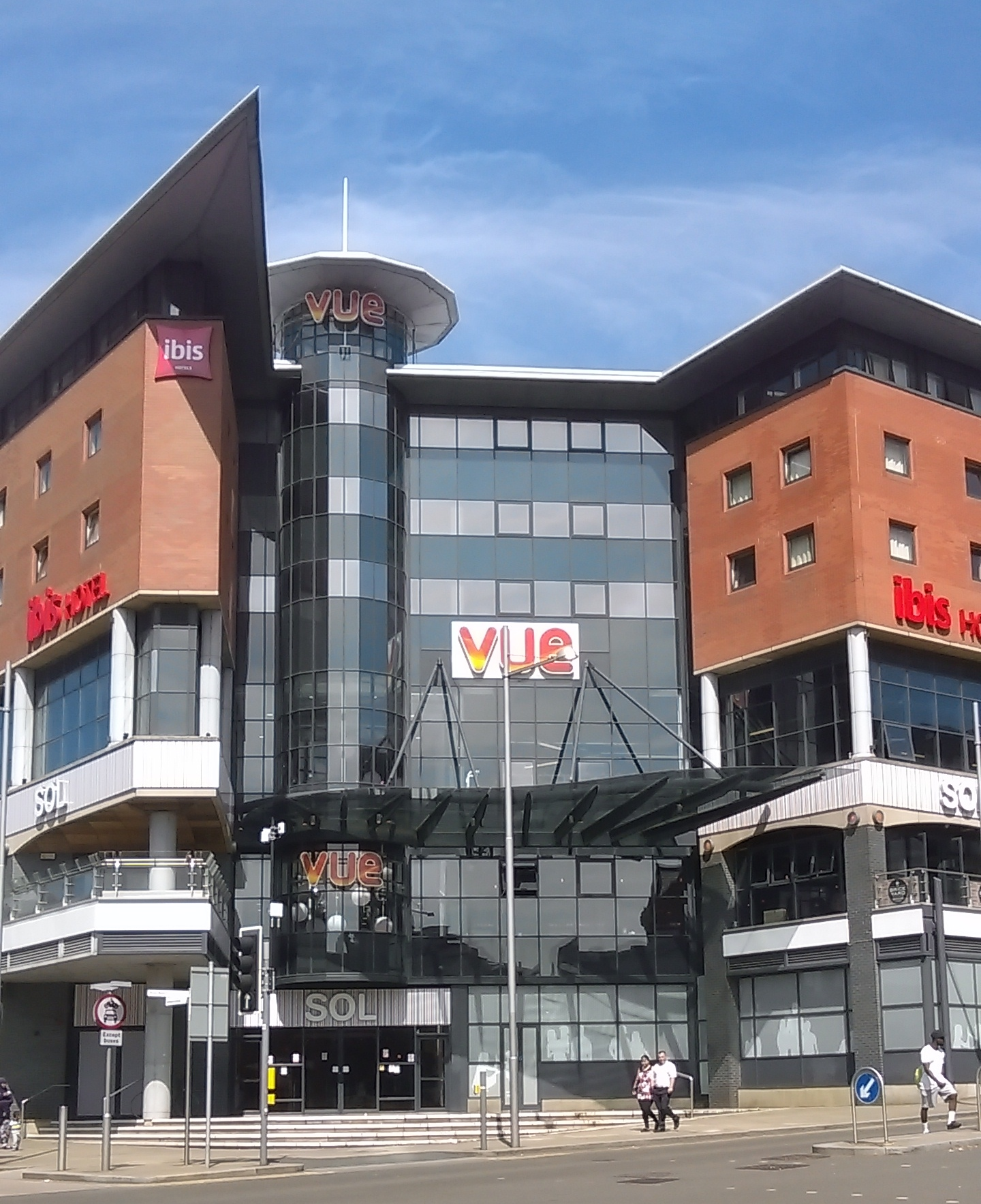
Front entrance to the Sol complex

Sol Northampton (previously officially and still locally known as Sol Central Northampton) is a leisure complex in Northampton, England, with a multi-screen cinema, gym and beauty salon among other facilities. It was constructed in 2002 to replace the Barclaycard head office building previously sited there from the 1970s before relocating to the nearby Brackmills industrial estate.

In the late nineties after Barclaycard had moved to its new offices in Brackmills, plans were drawn up to redevelop the site. Northampton's then only main cinema was at Sixfields, constructed when the football club moved its home there. It was and is by and large difficult to get to from other areas in the town. The idea was to build a new leisure and retail space within the town centre similar to nearby places such as Milton Keynes which had recently opened the Xscape Centre.

When opened in 2002, it contained a hotel, night club/bar, gym and health club and a UCI (now Vue) 10-screen cinema complex seating over 2,500 with a 3-D facility.

In 2018 the "Central" was officially dropped from the name, and the owning company began looking for new tenants to fill vacant parts of the building.

In February 2020 the roof was damaged in high winds. This necessitated closure of two streets (Marefair and Horsemarket) bounding the site for 16 days, whilst the roof was repaired and adjudged to be safe.
