= Everard Bouverie =

British peer and soldier

- Born: 13 October 1789
- Died: 18 November 1871 (aged 82)
- Education: St John's College, Cambridge
- Spouse: Charlotte O'Donel (m. 1816)
- Father: Edward Bouverie
- Relatives: Edward Bouverie (grandfather)
- Military career
- Rank: Lieutenant-General
- Units: Royal Horse Guards; 15th Hussars
- Wars: Peninsula War

Lieutenant-General Everard William Bouverie (13 October 1789 – 18 November 1871) was the eldest son Edward Bouverie (junior) and Catherine, daughter and heir of William Castle. He was born on 13 October 1789, and was educated at Harrow and St. John’s College, Cambridge.

He married Charlotte daughter of Colonel Hugh O'Donel, of Newport, County Mayo, on 3 April 1816. They had no children.

== Military career ==
Everard joined the army as a Cornet in the Royal Horse Guards on 2 April 1812. Promotions followed with Lieutenant on 15 October 1812, Captain 9 September 1819, Battalion Major 6 May 1831, Lieutenant Colonel 4 December 1832, Colonel 16 September 1845, Major General 11 November 1851, Lieutenant General 30 July 1860 and General 9 April 1868.

He fought in the Peninsula War from November 1812 to April 1814, receiving the General Service Medal for his services at the battles of Vittoria and Toulouse. Following the conclusion of the Peninsula War and the return of Napoleon from exile, Bouverie was present at the Battle of Waterloo, where he was wounded. He was awarded the Waterloo Medal for participating in the battle.

In 1840 he was appointed Equerry to the Prince Consort, and Equerry to Queen Victoria in 1852.

Also in 1852 he attended the last Waterloo Banquet.

In 1859 he was made a colonel of the 15th Hussars.

== Legacy and death ==
Everard inherited Delapré Abbey from his father, Edward, in 1858.

Except for the main staircase, remodelled in the present square-shaped, which replaced a circular one built in the previous century, Everard undertook little in the way of work on the Abbey itself but endowed schools in Hardingstone and Far Cotton and had a keen interest in local affairs. He served as a Justice of the Peace, was on the management committee of St Andrew’s Hospital

Just prior to his death a number of the painting collected and inherited by his father were sold by auction at Christies.

By his will proved in 1872 gave £500 3% Annuities, the income thereof to be distributed amongst ten poor industrious families or persons of good character and sober habits in the parish of Hardingstone.

With no direct heir, on his death on 18 November 1871 Delapré Estate passed to his nephew John Augustus Sheil Bouverie senior, the son of the third Bouverie brother - Francis Kenelm Bouverie. The second brother Charles Bouverie having remained single.
