= Mrs. Richard Brinsley Sheridan (painting) =

Painting by Thomas Gainsborough

- Artist: Thomas Gainsborough
- Year: 1785-1787
- Medium: oil on canvas
- Dimensions: 219.7 cm × 153.7 cm (86.5 in × 60.5 in)
- Location: National Gallery of Art, Washington, D.C.

Mrs. Richard Brinsley Sheridan is an oil on canvas portrait painted by English artist Thomas Gainsborough, from 1785-1787. It was acquired by the National Gallery of Art, in Washington, D.C., in 1937. Mrs. Sheridan (Elizabeth Ann Linley) was a talented musician who enjoyed professional success in Bath and London before marrying Richard Brinsley Sheridan in 1773 and abandoning her career. She was 31-33 when she sat for Gainsborough, dying from tuberculosis seven years later at the age of thirty-eight. The portrait was painted between 1785 and 1787, and, was exhibited at Gainsborough's studio at Schomberg House, Pall Mall in 1786.

== Background ==
Elizabeth Ann Sheridan (née Linley) was born in the autumn of 1754 but the exact date varies with sources giving 4, 5 or 7 September, at either Abbey Green or 5 Pierrepont Street, Bath. Her father was Thomas Linley, an English musician and composer, and her mother was Mary Johnson (1729–1820) who was also a talented musician. Elizabeth was the couple's eldest daughter – there was an older brother but he died in early childhood– several of whom inherited their parents musical abilities. It is likely she began singing at concerts when she was only nine years old and made her formal stage début alongside her brother, also named Thomas, in 1767 at Covent Garden, London.

At the end of 1770, she was betrothed to an elderly but wealthy suitor, Walter Long, but the engagement was broken off shortly before the wedding took place. Long paid her compensation of £3,000 in 1771 and she also received £1,000 worth of clothing and jewellery. She moved to France in 1772 accompanied by Richard Brinsley Sheridan and an invalid marriage may have taken place in March 1772 but there are no official records to verify it. The couple were officially married on 13 April 1773 after their return to Britain, the period when Elizabeth was described by Frances Burney as "infinitely superior to all other English singers." According to later newspaper reports their courtship was "one of the classic romances of the west country" and she was "the most beautiful singer in England". After they were officially married Sheridan would not allow her to appear on stage in a professional capacity as he felt it reflected badly on his status as a gentleman.

Thomas Gainsborough had been a friend of the family since 1759 and he painted several portraits of the Linley family. Elizabeth was also the model for the Joshua Reynolds painting St Cecilia, which was successfully exhibited at the Royal Academy in 1775, and described by Reynolds as "the best picture I ever painted."

The Sheridans had a tempestuous marriage as they were an ill-matched couple with Sheridan preferring city life in contrast to Elizabeth's love of the countryside. Elizabeth begged her husband to "Take me out of the whirl of the world, place me in the quiet and simple scenes of life I was born for." Sheridan had several affairs, as did Elizabeth, and they spent a great deal of time apart. By the time she was 36, in 1790, Elizabeth was showing signs of ill-health but had to maintain the appearance of an involvement with London society. While visiting Devonshire House Elizabeth met Lord Edward FitzGerald and they became lovers. She conceived a child by him, a baby girl who was born on 30 March 1792. The trauma of childbirth exacerbated Elizabeth's illness and she died of tuberculosis on 28 June 1792.

== Description ==
The oil on canvas painting measures 219.7 × 153.7 cm (86.5 × 60.5 in). The depiction of full-figure portraits in nature was a speciality of 18th-century English artists, especially Gainsborough who delighted in painting landscapes; Elizabeth with her love for the English countryside was the ideal model for him. The composition is diagonal and is in the grand manner genre. The NGA describes the work as "freely painted" and impressionistic in style. The sitter's garb and "the windblown landscape ... reflect the strong romantic component in Gainsborough's artistic temperament ... Her chin and mouth are firm, definite, and sculptural, and her heavily drawn eyebrows give her a steady, composed, and dignified expression. There is a hint of romantic melancholy in her eyes, with their slightly indirect gaze ... The painting is executed in liquid paint, blended wet into wet, applied in many layers in order to create a rich and sumptuous effect, with thin washes in free-flowing brushstrokes for the details."

Although using an outside setting, it is not a conversation piece; it has a certain psychological depth brought about with the attention given to the details of dress and texture as testaments to worldly elegance and wealth. The model's hair is treated in the same manner as the leaves and branches of the trees in the background and some of the sunset's pink glaze is reflected in the colour of her gown. The lonely tree behind her matches her isolated figure and adds to the impression of the remoteness of the abandoned feminine figure in the deserted landscape; possibly longing for something she cannot achieve in her life. A shimmering transparent effect is given to the hand-held scarf by the use of long brush strokes and thin oil colour. The portrait captures the model's charming personality and fresh beauty; her face is the only part of the painting that is calm and solid. The paint is applied with soft and nervous, flying brush strokes. The artist is treating the surface of the woman's gown with long zigzagging brushes of thin oil paint all the way down to her feet, to achieve the vibrant effect, versus the calm of her face.

The painting came into the possession of Harriet, Lady Robert Spencer (previously wife of Edward Bouverie) of Delapre Abbey, who were friends of the Sheridan's as a result, of Sheridan's money problems. In her diary on 12 March 1872, following the sale of the portrait by Harriet's grandson General Everard Bouverie to Alfred de Rothschild. Mrs. Caulfield, wife of the second son of the first Earl of Charlesmont wrote:-

"I have heard today of the sale of the beautiful portrait of Mrs. Sheridan by Gainsborough, which I have gased at so often over the library fireplace at Delapré, and that it bought £3,000. Baron Rothschild being the purchaser. I think it well to note that that I heard from the father of the late General B., known as Squire Bouverie, the manner in which the picture came into the family. Sheridan was at the time in great money difficulties, and living next door to Lady Robert Spencer, Squire Bouverie's mother, when a seizure was made by the Sheriff. Sheridan's servant knew the value his master set on this picture of his beautiful wife, and he managed to detach it hurriedly from the frame (a very large one and to get it over the wall into Lady Robert Spencer's garden. Poor Sheridan was glad to save the picture from his creditors, and leave it in his fiend's hands, from whom he got advances of money until he should redeem it. That redemption never occurred, and so it became Bouverie property, and has now realised £3,000."

The painting was subsequently owned by various members of the famous Rothschild banking family up until 1936, when it was sold to the Duveen Brothers, Inc., in London. The A.W. Mellon Educational and Charitable Trust, Pittsburgh bought the artwork on 26 April 1937 and it was then donated to the National Gallery of Art.
