= Far Cotton and Delapre =

Coordinates: 54.7238°N 3.1957°W

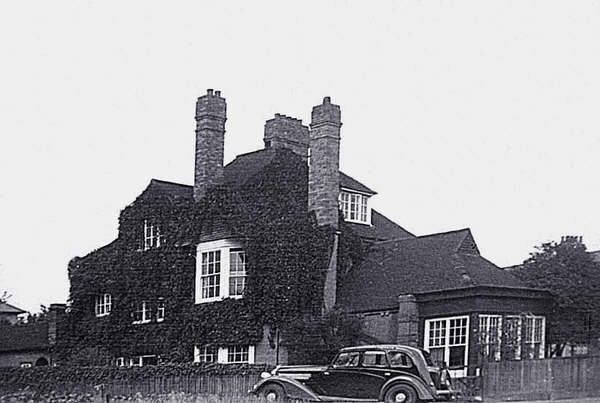

- Location within Northamptonshire
- Population: 12,209 (2021 census)
- Civil parish: Far Cotton and Delapre
- Unitary authority: West Northamptonshire
- Ceremonial county: Northamptonshire
- Region: East Midlands
- Country: England
- Sovereign state: United Kingdom
- Police: Northamptonshire
- Fire: Northamptonshire
- Ambulance: East Midlands
- Website: https://www.farcottonanddelapre-cc.gov.uk/

Far Cotton and Delapre is a civil parish in the West Northamptonshire district, in the ceremonial county of Northamptonshire, England. It comprises the two villages of Far Cotton and Delapre. In 2021 the parish had a population of 12,209.

== History ==
The parish was formed on 1 April 2020 from the unparished area of Northampton and became part of the non-metropolitan district of Northampton. In 2021 the parish became part of West Northamptonshire unitary authority area.

== See also ==
- Delapré Abbey
