= Thomas Croxen Archer =

British botanist

- Born: Hardingstone, Northamptonshire
- Known for: Director of the Industrial Museum of Scotland / the Edinburgh Museum of Science and Art (now part of National Museum of Scotland)
- Spouse: Mary Eleanor Salmon
- Scientific career
- Fields: Botany
- Author abbrev. (botany): Archer

Thomas Croxen Archer FRSE FSA FRSSA (28 November 1817 – 19 February 1885) was a British botanist, and from 1860 was Director of the Industrial Museum of Scotland, renamed the Edinburgh Museum of Science and Art in 1864, a post he held until his death in 1885 (the museum has since been merged into the National Museum of Scotland).

The standard author abbreviation Archer is used to indicate this person as the author when citing a botanical name.

== Early life and education ==
Archer was born in 1817 in Hardingstone in Northamptonshire.

== Career ==
From 1842 to 1856, he worked as a customs officer in Liverpool. He studied botany at the medical school in Liverpool and at Queen's College there, and went on to be Professor of Botany at the college.

Archer was Superintendent and then Director of the Industrial Museum of Scotland, from 1860 to 1864.

He then became the first Director of the Edinburgh Museum of Science and Art, a post he held from 1864 until his death in 1885. The museum later became the Royal Scottish Museum, and in 2006 was merged with the National Museum of Antiquities of Scotland to form the National Museum of Scotland.

He was a member of the Royal Scottish Society of Arts from 1861 (and its President in 1874), the Botanical Society of Edinburgh (President for 1861–62), and the Royal Society of Edinburgh. He was elected as a member of the American Philosophical Society in 1876.

== Personal life ==
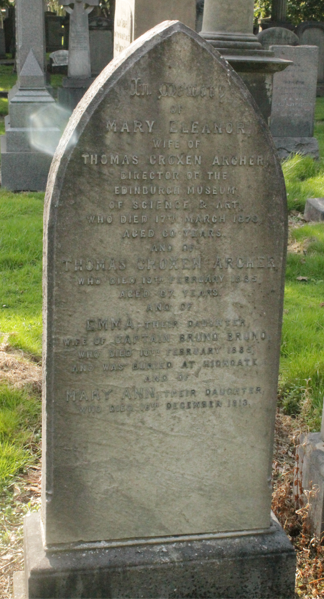
The grave of Thomas Croxen Archer, Grange Cemetery

On 27 December 1841, he married Mary Eleanor Salmon (1818-1879) at St. Paul's, Deptford, London. Their daughter Emma Archer married Captain Bruno Bruno (sic).

In 1861, he was living at 46 Gilmore Place, with his wife Mary Eleanor Archer, seven children and two other people.

In 1881, he was living at 5 West Newington Terrace, with two of his children and five other people.

He died on 19 February 1885 and is buried in Grange Cemetery in south Edinburgh. The grave lies on the south-east corner of the main north-west section facing the main central path.
