= Far Cotton =

Area of Northampton, England

Coordinates: 52.21961°N 0.90356°W

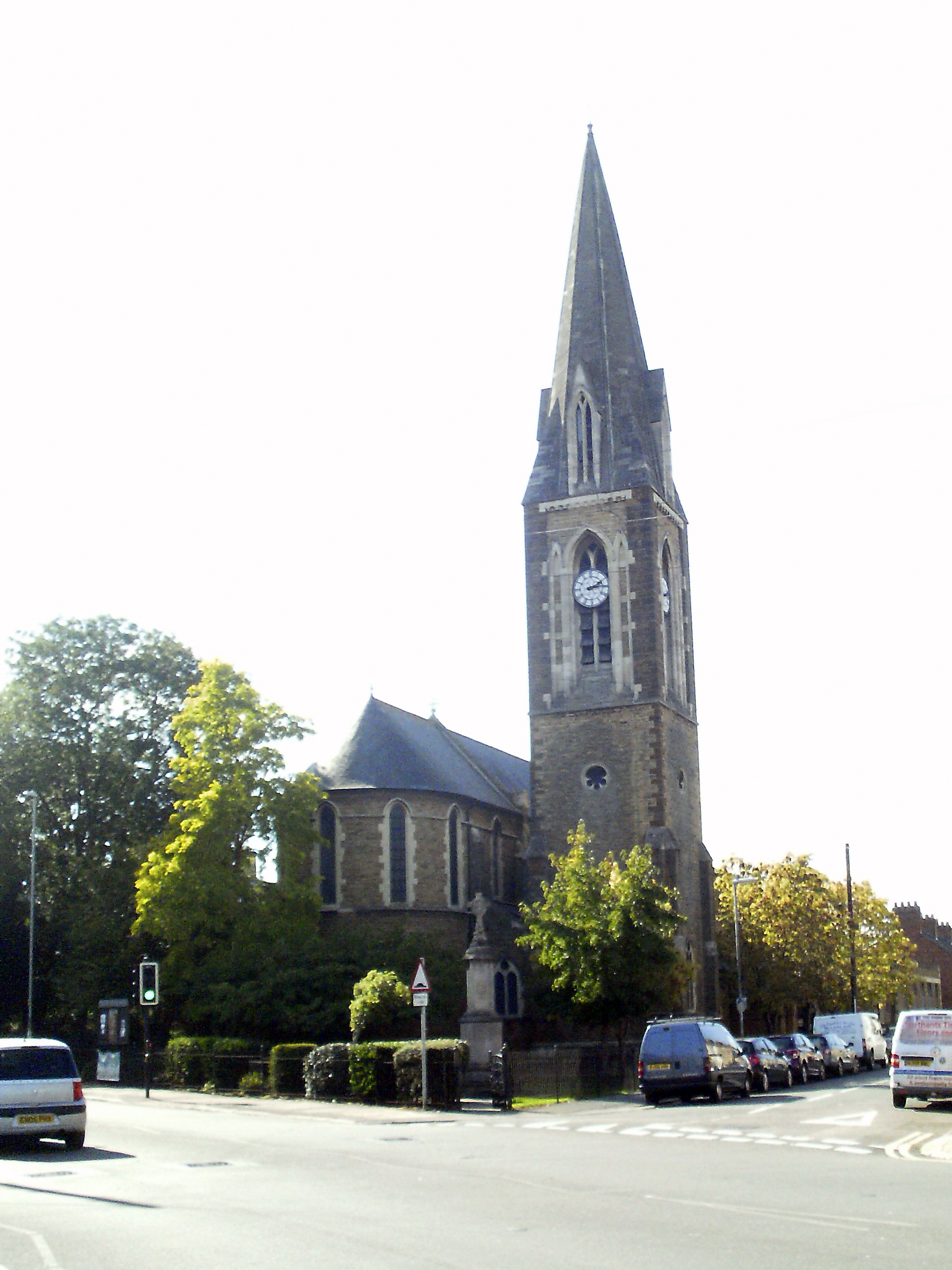
- St Mary's church, Far Cotton

- Location within Northamptonshire
- OS grid reference: SP750585
  - London: 67 miles
- Civil parish: Far Cotton and Delapre
- Unitary authority: West Northamptonshire
- Ceremonial county: Northamptonshire
- Region: East Midlands
- Country: England
- Sovereign state: United Kingdom
- Post town: Northampton
- Postcode district: NN4 8
- Dialling code: 01604 66-, 70- or 76-
- Police: Northamptonshire
- Fire: Northamptonshire
- Ambulance: East Midlands
- UK Parliament: Northampton South

Far Cotton is a village and neighbourhood of Northampton and former civil parish, now in the parish of Far Cotton and Delapre, in the West Northamptonshire district of Northamptonshire, England.

== Location ==
Far Cotton is due south of the town centre, beyond Cotton End - hence the 'Far' - and just south of the River Nene. It is roughly rectangular in shape with the river and Northampton branch of the Grand Union Canal forming its northern boundary. The railway line, part of the Northampton Loop Line just south of Northampton railway station is on the western edge. The A5076 ring road is the southern boundary and Delapré Abbey's park forms the eastern boundary up to the A45 road.

== Administration ==
From elections on and after 2011, Far Cotton was in the Parish of St Mary and Delapre Ward of the Northampton Borough Council, and on Northamptonshire County Council, the Delapre and Rushmere Division. As of 2021, following local government reorganisation, the parish now forms part of the Delapre ward of West Northamptonshire Council.

== History ==
Far Cotton was first recorded in 1196 under the name Cotes. That name derived from the Old English "Cot" meaning a cottage or hut, Cotes being a plural form. Cotton derives from the same word and is also plural and thus meant "cottages" or "huts." Historically Far Cotton was a hamlet in the parish of Hardingstone. It expanded with the arrival of the Northampton and Peterborough Railway, opened in 1845. The original line, on which Northampton Bridge Street railway station was situated, was entirely south of the Nene while the medieval town was north of the river.

St Mary's Church was built in Towcester Road in 1885 to the design of Matthew Holding.

There was an iron ore quarry at Far Cotton from 1883 to 1889 run by the Hunsbury Hill Iron Company. The quarry was bounded by Rothersthorpe Road on the north, Towcester Road on the east and the main railway on the west. At the southern end of the quarry it extended across the top of the northern end of the railway tunnel. Much of the site is now built on. The ore was taken by horse-drawn tramway through a bridge under Rothersthorpe Road to the Northampton Blisworth Railway west of the junction with the line linking Bridge Street with the present station (Castle Station.). From there it was taken by rail to the company's ironworks near Duston Mill.

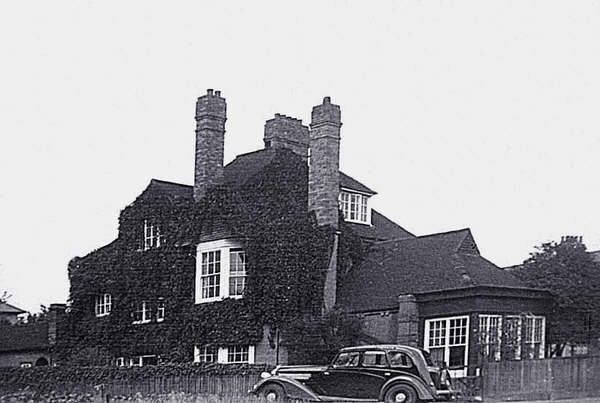
A house in Far Cotton in 1939

== Governance ==
There are two tiers of local government covering Far Cotton, at parish and unitary authority level: Far Cotton and Delapre Community Council and West Northamptonshire Council, based in Northampton.

=== Administrative history ===
Far Cotton and neighbouring Cotton End were both in the ancient parish of Hardingstone. The Northampton parliamentary constituency was extended south of the River Nene in 1868 to include the Cotton End and Far Cotton areas of the parish. In 1871 the parts of the parish within the Northampton constituency were made a local government district called Hardingstone, despite the village of Hardingstone being in the part of the parish outside the local government district. The Hardingstone district was enlarged in 1874 to take in the ecclesiastical parish of St James, which had been created in 1872 covering the growing western suburbs of Northampton.

Local government districts were reconstituted as urban districts under the Local Government Act 1894, which also said that parishes could no longer straddle district boundaries. Hardingstone parish was therefore reduced to cover just the part of the parish outside the urban district, whilst the part inside the urban district became a parish called Far Cotton. The confusion of having a Hardingstone Urban District which did not contain Hardingstone itself did not last long; in 1896 the urban district was divided into two urban districts called Far Cotton and St James. The Far Cotton Urban District was short-lived; it was abolished four years later in 1900 and absorbed into the county borough of Northampton. The civil parish of Far Cotton continued to exist until 1932, but as an urban parish it did not have a parish council, always being directly governed by the urban district or borough councils above it. In 1931 the parish had a population of 7268. Far Cotton is in the ecclesiastical parish of St Mary.

From 1900 onwards Far Cotton was therefore part of Northampton. A new civil parish covering the area was created in 2020 under the name "Far Cotton and Delapre", as part of the preparation for the abolition of the borough of Northampton the following year to become part of West Northamptonshire.

== More recent developments ==
As part of the regeneration of the town, overseen by the West Northamptonshire Development Corporation, many brownfield sites in Far Cotton underwent redevelopment in the first decade of the twenty-first century including the new housing estates of Riverside Wharf, Cotton End and Southbridge. Extensive development was to occur on former disused warehouses east of Far Cotton. Nunn Mills was to be developed to build over 3,000 new houses on a brownfield site. There will also be an improved Marina in and around Becket's Park and Midsummer Meadow.

The main shopping sector of Far Cotton is St Leonard's Road which connects Towcester Road and London Road. There are also shops on Gloucester Avenue. There is a local shop just south of Far Cotton in Mereway and a supermarket in Cotton End on Ransome Road. A supermarket opened in nearby Newport Pagnell Road in 2013 next to a garden centre.

As of 2010, Far Cotton was set to double in population in the next ten years with development of housing, much of this having already taken place in the Cotton End area.

== 1998 floods ==
In April 1998, many residents of Far Cotton had to leave their homes (albeit temporarily) and seek temporary accommodation elsewhere, after part of Far Cotton, along with another part of Northampton, St James, suffered flooding, when the River Nene broke its banks. Flooding occurred on Good Friday, 10 April 1998, a day which became known locally as "the long Good Friday". Since that time river banks have been raised and flood mitigation lakes created west of the town.

== Notable residents ==
Robert Adams, a sculptor and designer was born in Far Cotton.

Chief Inspector Walter Dew, who was involved in the hunt for both Jack the Ripper and Dr. Crippen, was born in the village in 1863.
