= Cotton End, Northampton =

District of Northampton, England

Coordinates: 52.222°N 0.904°W

Cotton End
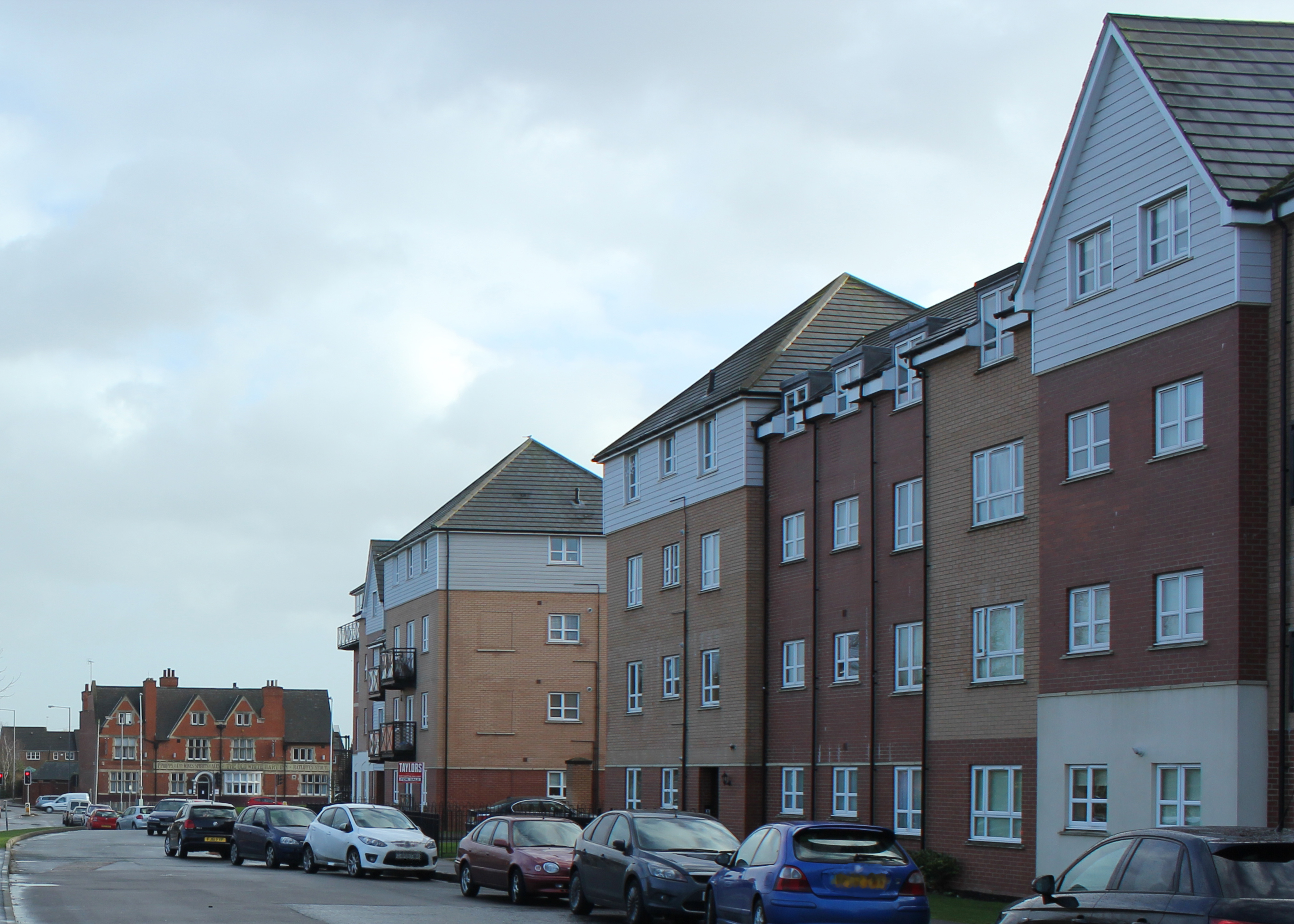
- View from West Cotton Close, Cotton End looking east towards the White Hart pub on the road 'Cotton End'

- Location within Northamptonshire
- OS grid reference: SP750596
  - London: 67 miles
- Unitary authority: West Northamptonshire
- Ceremonial county: Northamptonshire
- Region: East Midlands
- Country: England
- Sovereign state: United Kingdom
- Post town: NORTHAMPTON
- Postcode district: NN4 8B_ and NN4 8R_
- Police: Northamptonshire
- Fire: Northamptonshire
- Ambulance: East Midlands
- UK Parliament: Northampton South

Cotton End is a small district of the town of Northampton, England, about half a mile south of the town centre, north of the area known as Far Cotton and west of the road from South Bridge to Ransome Road known as Cotton End. The district population is included in the Delapre and Briar Hill Ward of Northampton Council.

== History ==
The area was established as a small industrial site in the late 19th century. On the 1899 1:2500 Ordnance Survey map the site is located to the west and south of South Bridge over the River Nene between the river and the former Bedford to Northampton railway line and north of the Old Towcester Road and the former Bridge Street railway station (opened 1845). The area appears to have been entirely industrial in contrast to the area south of the railway line which is the residential area of Far Cotton.

In the 1990s the area was cleared and used for housing with the name of Old Towcester Road changed to West Cotton Close.

The area to the east of the original Cotton End is shown on the old Ordnance Survey map as having some industrial units close to the south bank of the river with a goods shed, other railway works and a pub and offices fronting the main road. This area was also referred to as Cotton End and became entirely industrial with removal of the railway sidings. During the 1990s part of this site fronting the river was also developed as housing off a new road called New South Bridge Road as the Old Towcester Road industrial development was out of date. Part of the site next to the river was occupied by a large iron foundry, Rice & Co, which was on the site from 1928-1997.

The Northampton Branch of the Grand Union Canal from Blisworth runs adjacent to the north of the site, just south of the River Nene, joining with the river via a lock.

=== 1998 floods ===
In April 1998, many residents of both Far Cotton and Cotton End had to leave their homes and seek temporary accommodation elsewhere, after part of the whole area, along with another part of Northampton, St James, suffered flooding, when the River Nene broke its banks. Flooding occurred on Good Friday, 10 April 1998, a day which became known locally as "the long Good Friday". Since then river banks have been raised and flood mitigation lakes created west of the town.

== Area maps and views ==
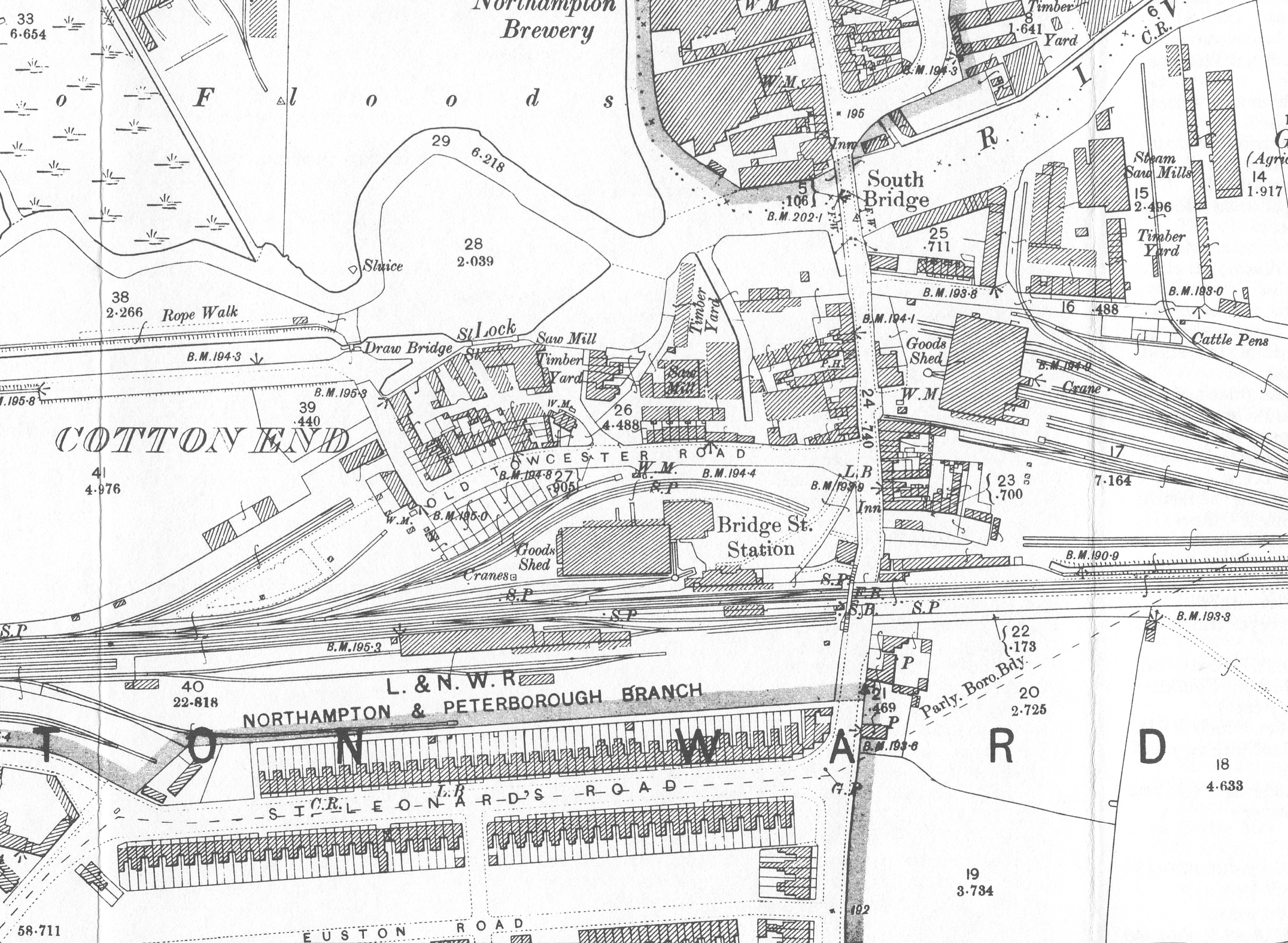
Extract of Old Ordnance Survey map of Northampton 1899 showing Cotton End, The long building south of the goods shed is still in use by Network Rail

Open map extract for Cotton End dated 2014 showing the current day area shown on the 1899 map

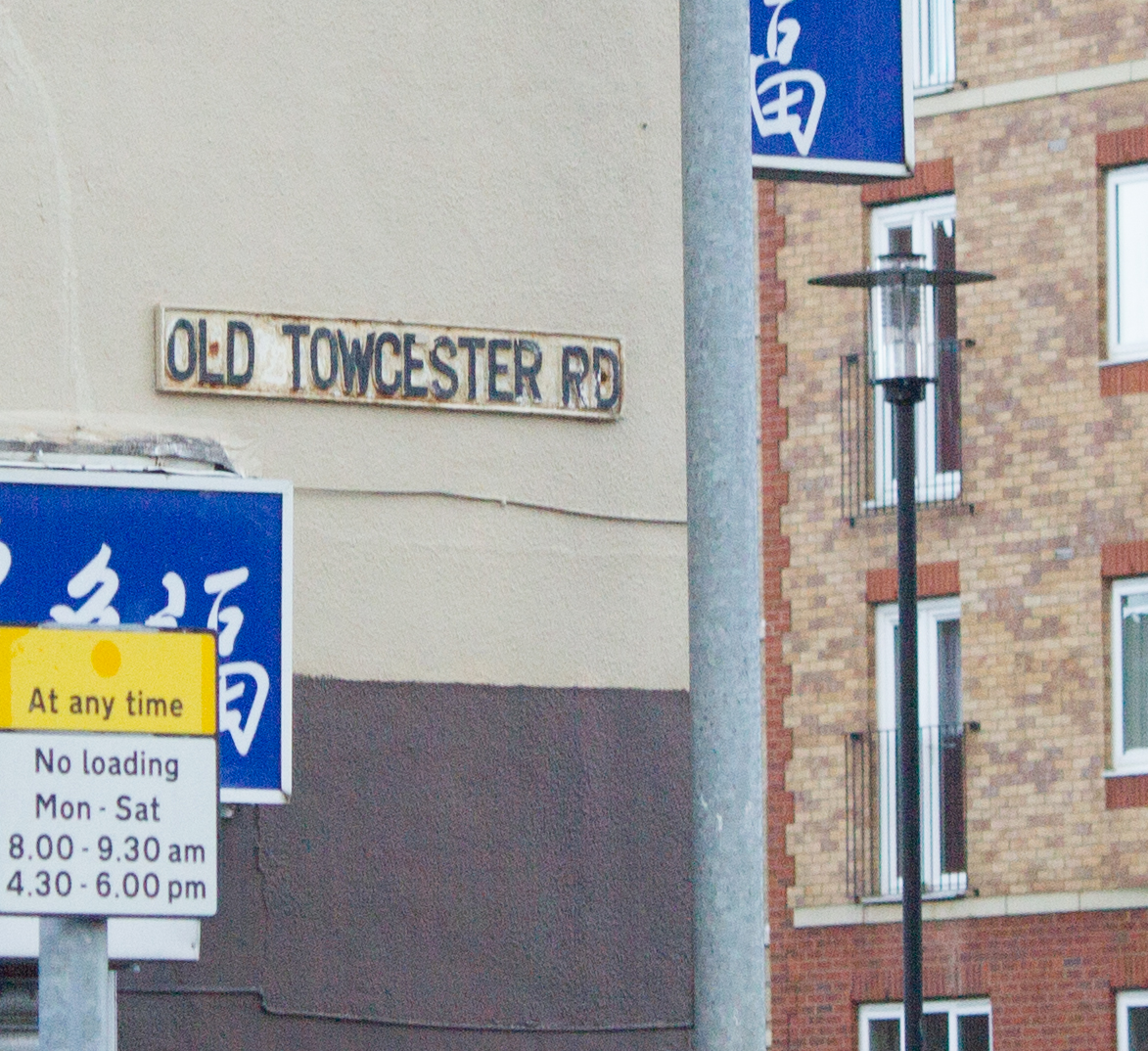
All that remains of the original road and name, 6 January 2014

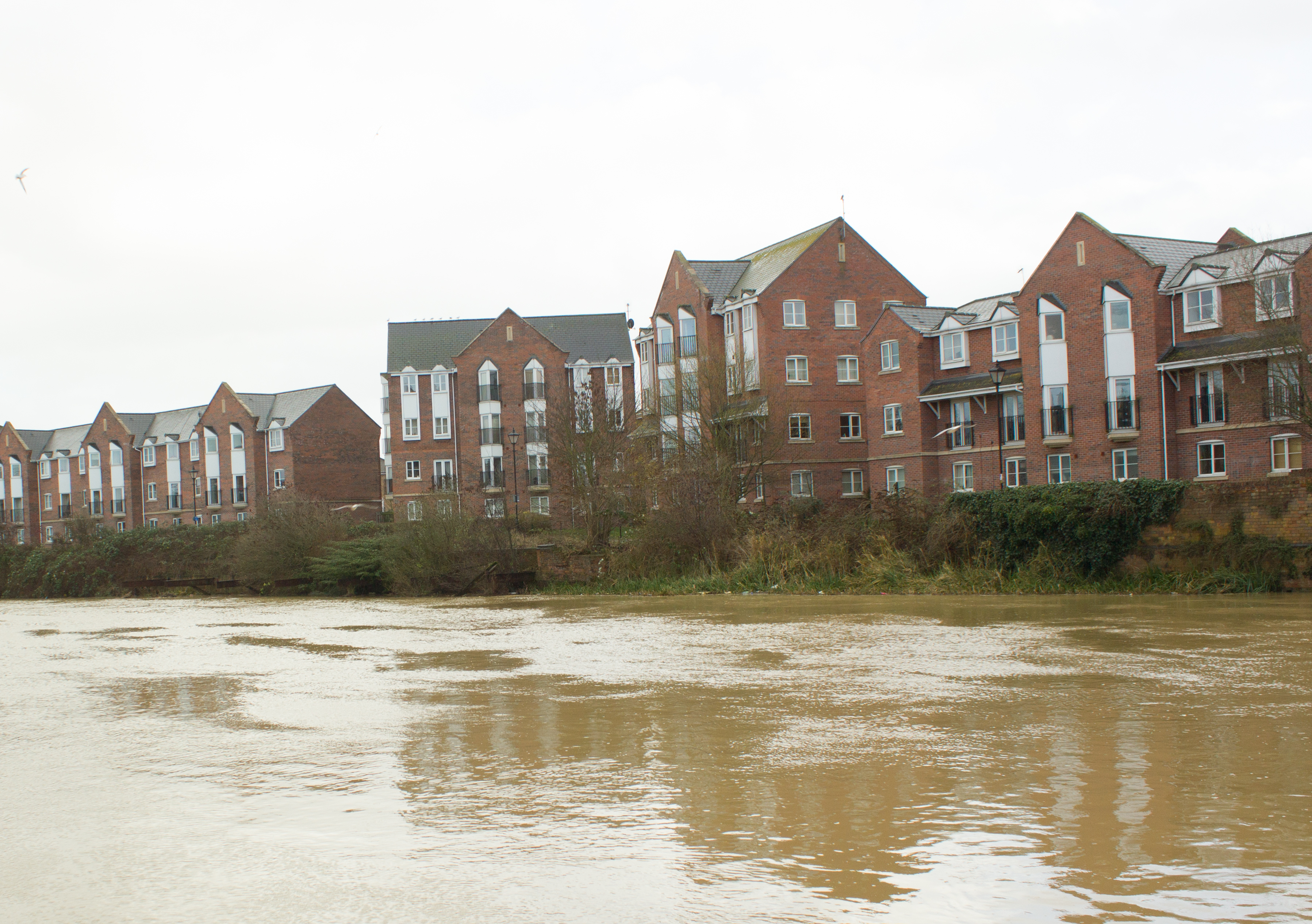
The east housing development of Cotton End on the south bank of the River Nene after several days of heavy rain

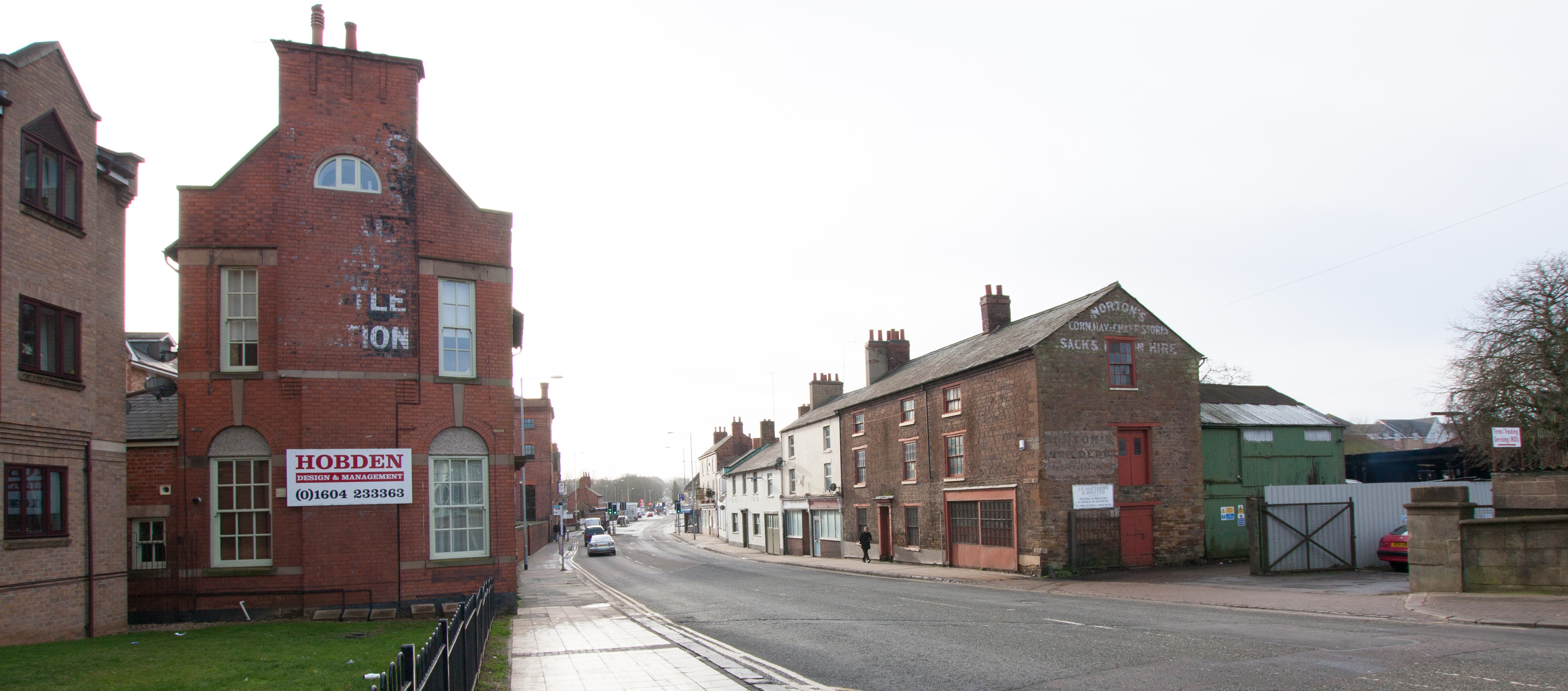
Looking south of the main road through Cotton End south from South Bridge. The road here is known as 'Cotton End' from the bridge as far as the furthest traffic lights and most visitor's first view of the town centre from the south
