= Delapré Abbey =

Stately home in Northampton, England

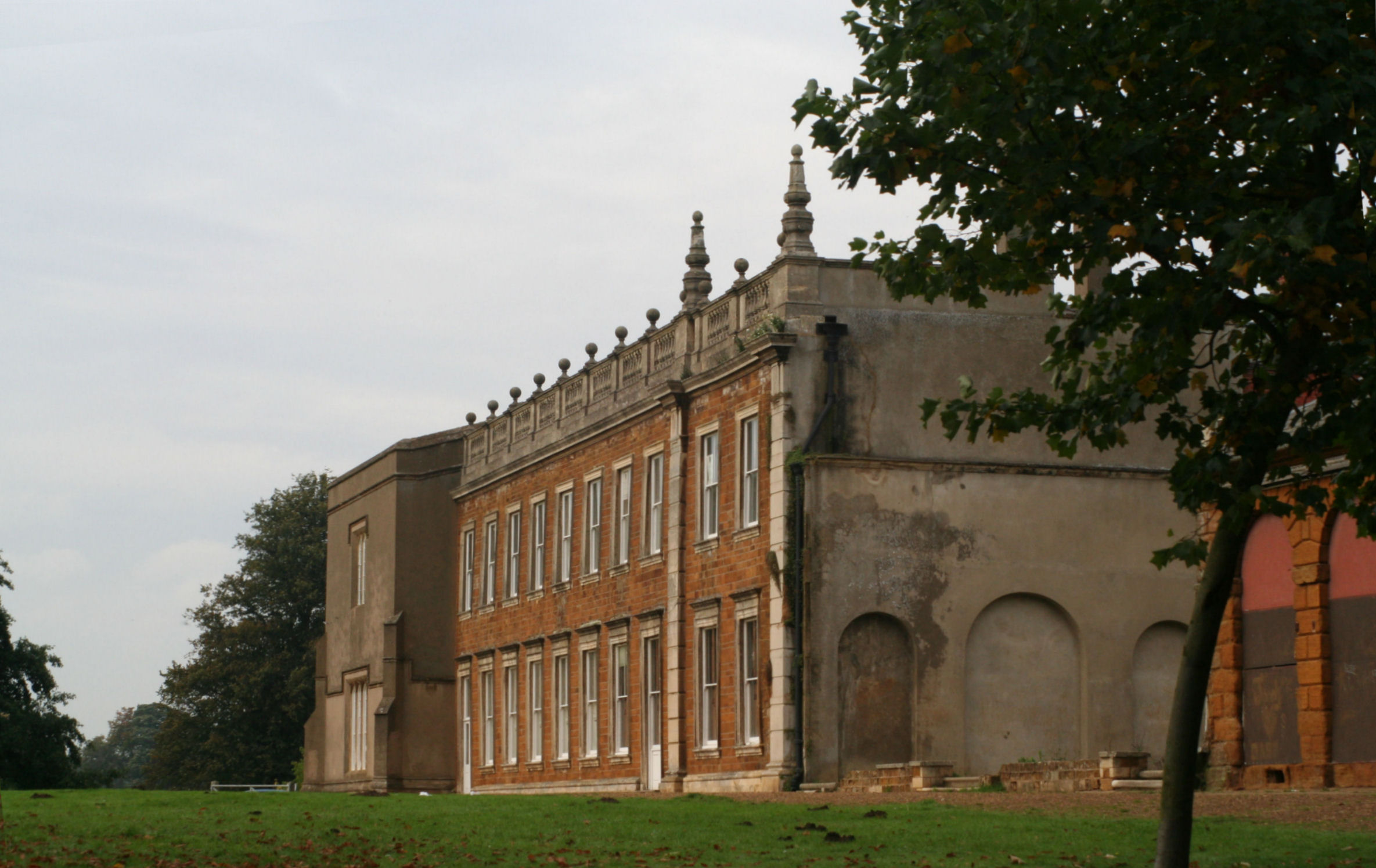
- Delapré Abbey – the south facade

- Location within Northamptonshire

Monastery information
- Full name: Abbey of St Mary de la Pré; The Abbey of St Mary in the Meadow
- Order: Cluniac Nuns
- Established: c. 1145
- Disestablished: 1538
- Mother house: Abbey of Cluny
- Dedication: St Mary de la Pré, Sancta Maria de pratis, St Mary in the Meadows
- Diocese: Lincoln

People
- Founder: Simon de Senlis, 4th Earl of Huntingdon and Northampton

Site
- Location: Hardingstone (extreme north of the parish), Northampton
- Coordinates: 52.2247°N 0.8895°W
- Grid reference: SP759592
- Visible remains: None
- Public access: Yes
- Website: delapreabbey.org

Delapré Abbey is a neo-classical mansion in Northampton, England.

The mansion and outbuildings incorporate remains of a former monastery, the Abbey of St Mary de la Pré (the suffix meaning "in or of the Meadow"), near the River Nene, 1 mile (1.6 km) south southeast of the centre of Northampton. It was founded as a nunnery about the year 1145 devoted to the congregation of the major Abbey of Cluny in Burgundy, France.

The Abbey's expansive sloping grounds were the site of the Battle of Northampton (1460) in the Wars of the Roses and are a registered battlefield.

== Founding and endowments ==
The abbey was founded by an Anglo-Norman Earl, Simon de Senlis, during the reign of King Stephen and later benefited from paying for a royal charter granted by King Edward III. At its founding the abbey was endowed with the 3,060 acres (12.4 km^{2}) in its ancient parish "almost entirely" save, for example, two corn mills, a fulling mill and 10 acres of marsh-meadow of St James Abbey, Northampton: Hardingstone and held the rectories (including glebe and tithe) at Earls Barton, Great Doddington, and Fotheringhay, appointing stipended (salaried) vicars on a perpetual basis from 1224. Edward I added to Delapré the churches of Wollaston and Filgrave – a total of five Northamptonshire well-endowed churches – and gave Delapré the advowson (right to nominate the priest) of Fyfield, Hampshire. He is recorded as giving ten beams towards the repair of the church in 1232, and another five oaks for work on the refectory in 1258.

== Work and customs of the town and abbey ==
Delapré was one of two Cluniac nunneries in England (the other being Arthington Priory in Yorkshire). The Cluniac congregation was initially a reform movement of Benedictine life. Monasteries in the congregation were supervised directly by the great abbey at Cluny. Typically a dozen to twenty nuns resided at any one time. The Guild of Weavers at Northampton made an annual procession to the abbey church each Easter Monday where, according to the ordinances of the guild in 1431, they would offer up tapers before the images of the Trinity and Our Lady.

From its first foundation, the abbey gave 21s. 8d. yearly to the poor distributed by the parish church in money, bread, and fish, and a further 5s. yearly from later benefactions.

As with others, the abbey was surrendered to the crown as part of the Dissolution of the Monasteries, closing in 1538. After much later use and alteration as a private residence and in World War II service, the house and its cluster of outbuildings which replaced the abbey in phased building works spanning the 16th to 18th centuries served as the Northamptonshire Record Office and the library of the related records society. The building is Grade II* listed. A heritage shop and café overlooking its grand courtyard opened in 2017. The main building opened for educational visits, tours and weddings at the end of 2017. The Delapré Abbey Preservation Trust manages the buildings.

== History ==
=== Eleanor cross ===
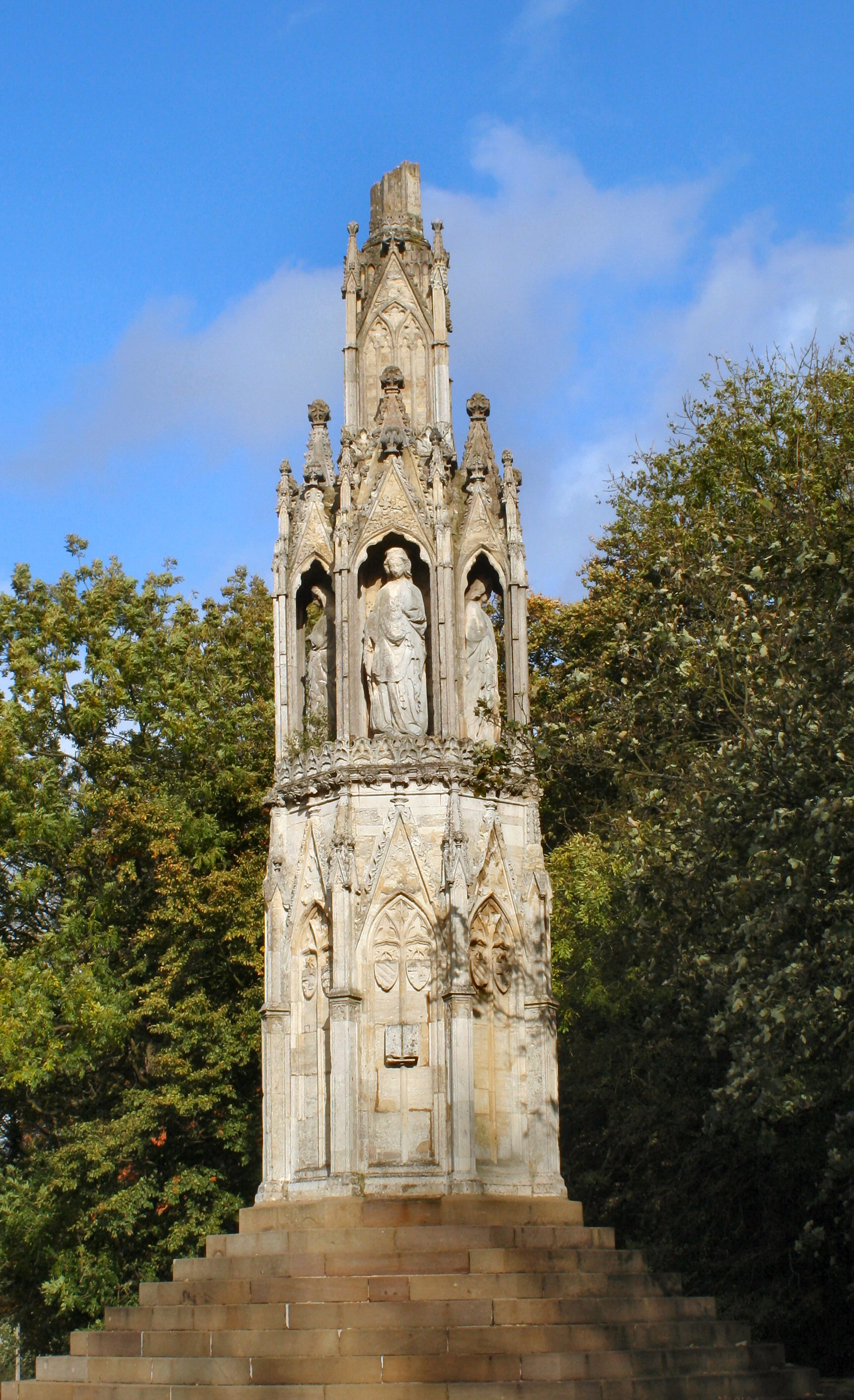
The Eleanor Cross, in the present grounds

One of three remaining Eleanor crosses of the twelve erected, an octagonal, slim, deeply carved tower featuring stone statues is at the south-west of the meadows and tree-lined grounds. The body of Eleanor of Castile, queen of Edward I, rested at the abbey on its journey from Lincoln to London in December 1290. The king erected the crosses to mark the passage. The cross was begun in 1291 by John of Battle; he worked with William of Ireland to carve the statues. Its lower tier of stone books may have featured prayers for the Queen's soul and her biography. A causeway leading from the town to the cross was constructed by Robert son of Henry.

The grounds of Delapré are a Scheduled Monument due to their partial battlefield status.

=== St Andrew's Priory built by a relative of founder ===
In the north-west corner of the walled town depicted in John Speed's map of 1610 was the Cluniac priory of St Andrew founded by Simon de Senlis, Earl of Northampton the father of the founder of Delapré.

=== Timeline ===
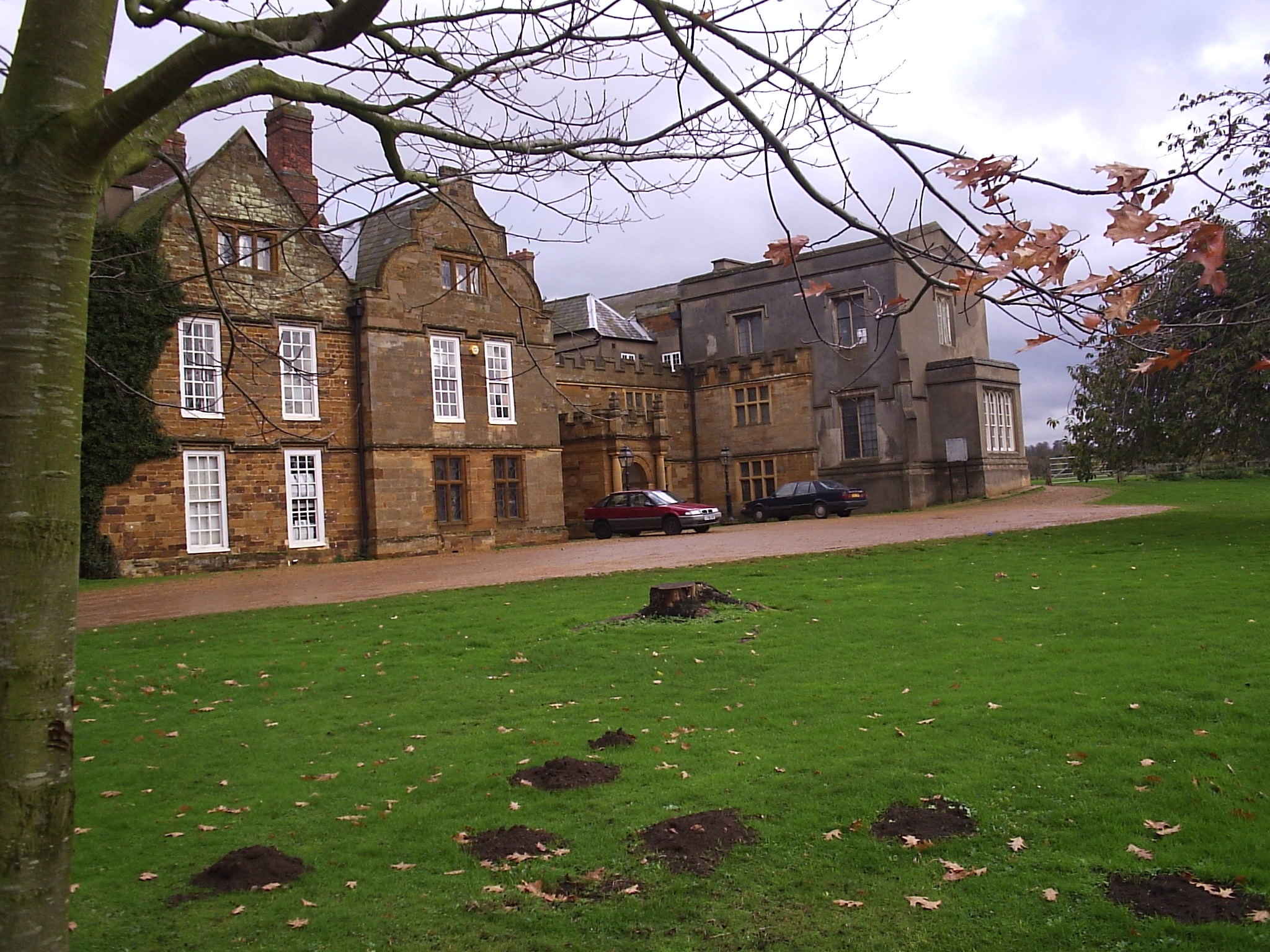
The west front

- 1145 – Delapré Abbey was built by Simon, the son of Simon de Senlis, the 2nd Earl of Northampton.
- 1290 – The death of Eleanor of Castile, the wife of Edward I and Queen of England. Eleanor died on 28 November at Harby, Nottinghamshire. Her body was embalmed at Lincoln, and on 4 December a funeral procession set out for Westminster Abbey accompanied by the King. The cortège travelled through Northampton and stopped at Delapré Abbey for the night. The King stayed at Northampton Castle. The cortège left the following day and, at the top of the hill, the ground was consecrated. On this spot, one of the Eleanor Crosses was erected.
- 1460 – The Battle of Northampton between the Yorkists and Lancastrians took place at Delapré.
- 1538 – Under the Dissolution of the Monasteries during the English Reformation, King Henry VIII forced the Abbey to surrender to the Crown.
- 1543 – The Crown rented the site and grounds of the former abbey to a tenant.
- 1550 – The Crown sold the Delapré estate to the Tate family.
- 1756 – Sir Charles Hardy, Governor of New York, husband of Mary Tate, sold the estate to Edward Bouverie for £22,000.(equivalent to £4,136,000 in 2025)
- 1905 – The Bouverie family rented the estate to John Cooper, a Northampton boot and shoe manufacturer.
- 1914 – Miss Mary Bouverie moved back to the Abbey.
- 1940 – The War Office took over the Abbey. Miss Bouverie moved to Duston and later returned to a room over the stables in 1942; she died on 20 January 1943.
- 1946 – The Northampton Corporation purchased the estate for £56,000. (equivalent to £2,028,000 in 2025)
- 1948 – The War Office gave up its use of the Abbey house, after which there were proposals to demolish the building. (See Joan Wake (1884–1974))
- 1956-7 – The availability of funds raised by the Northamptonshire Record Society enabled repairs to be carried out to the building so that it could be used by Northamptonshire Record Office and the Northamptonshire Record Society.
- 1959 – Official opening of Northamptonshire Record Office at Delapré Abbey, following its relocation from Lamport Hall.
- 2004 – Seven people began living in the south & west wings as live-in security. In 2012 there were still seven people, including two from the original group.
- 2005 – Northampton Borough Council announced plans to form a new Delapré Abbey Trust.
- 2012 – The clock on the stable block was repaired just before the Queen's Jubilee in July 2012. The chimes of the clock were repaired in December 2012.

=== Owners of Delapre Abbey ===
- 1145–1538 The Cluniac Order of Nuns
- 1539–1543 Henry VIII
- 1543–1548 John Marsh
- 1548–1564 Anne Saunders, formerly Lady Longueville, and her fourth husband, Andrew Wadham, who died in 1550 without progeny; a "gentleman usher to the Queen's Majesty" to Catherine Parr, and a son of Sir Nicholas Wadham (1472–1542). Anne, daughter of the Protestant martyr Laurence Saunders, was the mother of the next owner (by her second husband).
- 1564–1601 Bartholomew Tate I
- 1601–1617 William Tate
- 1617–1650 Zouch Tate
- 1650–1695 William Tate
- 1695–1704 Bartholomew Tate II
- 1704–1749 Bartholomew Tate III
- 1749–1750 Mary Tate
- 1750–1756 Charles Hardy
- 1756–1810 Edward Bouverie Senior
- 1810–1858 Edward Bouverie Junior
- 1858–1871 Everard Bouverie
- 1871–1894 John Austustus Shiel Bouverie Senior
- 1894–1905 John Austustus Shiel Bouverie Junior (died 1905) unmarried)
- 1905–1943 Mary Bouverie (sister of the above)
- 1943–1946 William Uthwatt Bouverie
- 1946–2018 Northampton Corporation (later known as Northampton Borough Council)
- 2018-now Delapré Abbey Preservation Trust

=== Abbesses of the Abbey of St Mary de la Pré ===
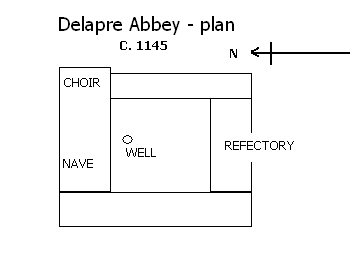

- Azelina 1145
- Cecilia de Daventry – elected 1220
- Agatha – died 1274
- Emma Malore – elected 1274, died 1282
- Margery de Wolaston – elected 1282, died 1296–1297 – The Abbess at the time of the death of Queen Eleanor
- Margery de Broke – elected 1297, resigned 1319
- Agnes de Poveley – elected 1319, died 1327
- Margaret de Grey – elected 1327–1328, died 1333–1334
- Isabel de Cotesbrok – elected 1333–1334, annulled by the local bishop
- Katherine Knyvet – appointed 1333–1334, died 1349 of the plague
- Isabel de Thorp – appointed 1349, resigned 1366
- Joan Mallore – elected 1366, died 1394
- Margery Dayrell – elected 1394
- Katherine Wotton appears in 1415
- Gonora Downghton – died 1481 – The Abbess at the time of the Battle of Northampton
- Joan Doghty – elected 1481
- Joan Chese – elected 1492
- Clementina Stock – elected 1504–1505, surrendered 1538

An impression of the great oval seal of the Abbey is held in the Public Records Office. It represents the coronation of the Blessed Virgin under a carved canopy.

=== The Cluniac Prayer ===
"O God, by whose grace thy servants, the Holy Abbots of Cluny, enkindled with the fire of thy love, became burning and shining lights in thy Church: Grant that we also may be aflame with the spirit of love and discipline, and may ever walk before thee as children of light; through Jesus Christ our Lord, who with thee, in the unity of the Holy Spirit, liveth and reigneth, one God, now and for ever."

=== Battle of Northampton (1460) ===
After the Battle of Northampton, which was fought on the Abbey grounds to the north of the Abbey and to the south of the River Nene, King Henry VI was captured and spent the night of 10 July 1460 at the Abbey as a prisoner. The nuns tended the wounds of those injured at the battle. It is believed that many of the battle-dead were buried in the nuns' graveyard (now the walled garden), but there is no archaeological evidence to support this contention.

=== After the dissolution ===
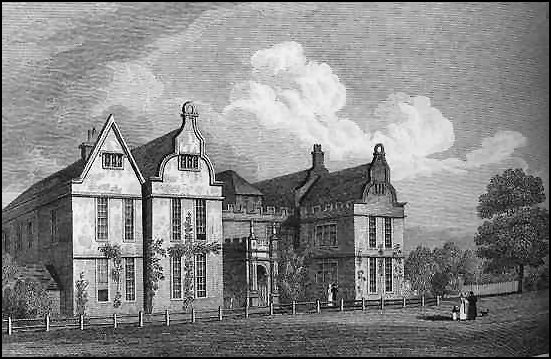
Print of the west front of the Abbey by J. P. Neale

In 1542 the Tate family purchased the Abbey grounds from the Crown; they started work on the gardens. Zouch Tate is recorded as having laid out a typical Elizabethan-style garden. This is thought to have been where the enclosed formal garden can now be found.

The Tates lived at Delapré until 1764, when they sold the estate to the Bouverie family. The majority of the present buildings date from this time. The design of the grounds became influenced by the style of Capability Brown. The Bouverie family changed the garden to one featuring fruit and vegetables, with orchards planted elsewhere. This was similar to the earlier fruit garden of the original abbey. Researchers believe the present walled garden is on the site of the nuns' burial ground, as evidence of graves was discovered during the garden's construction.

During the 19th century, other typical Victorian features were added, such as the rock and water gardens, and garden conservatories for peaches and grapes; a ha-ha was also constructed. The buildings for growing fruit remain.

== Condition ==
=== Buildings ===
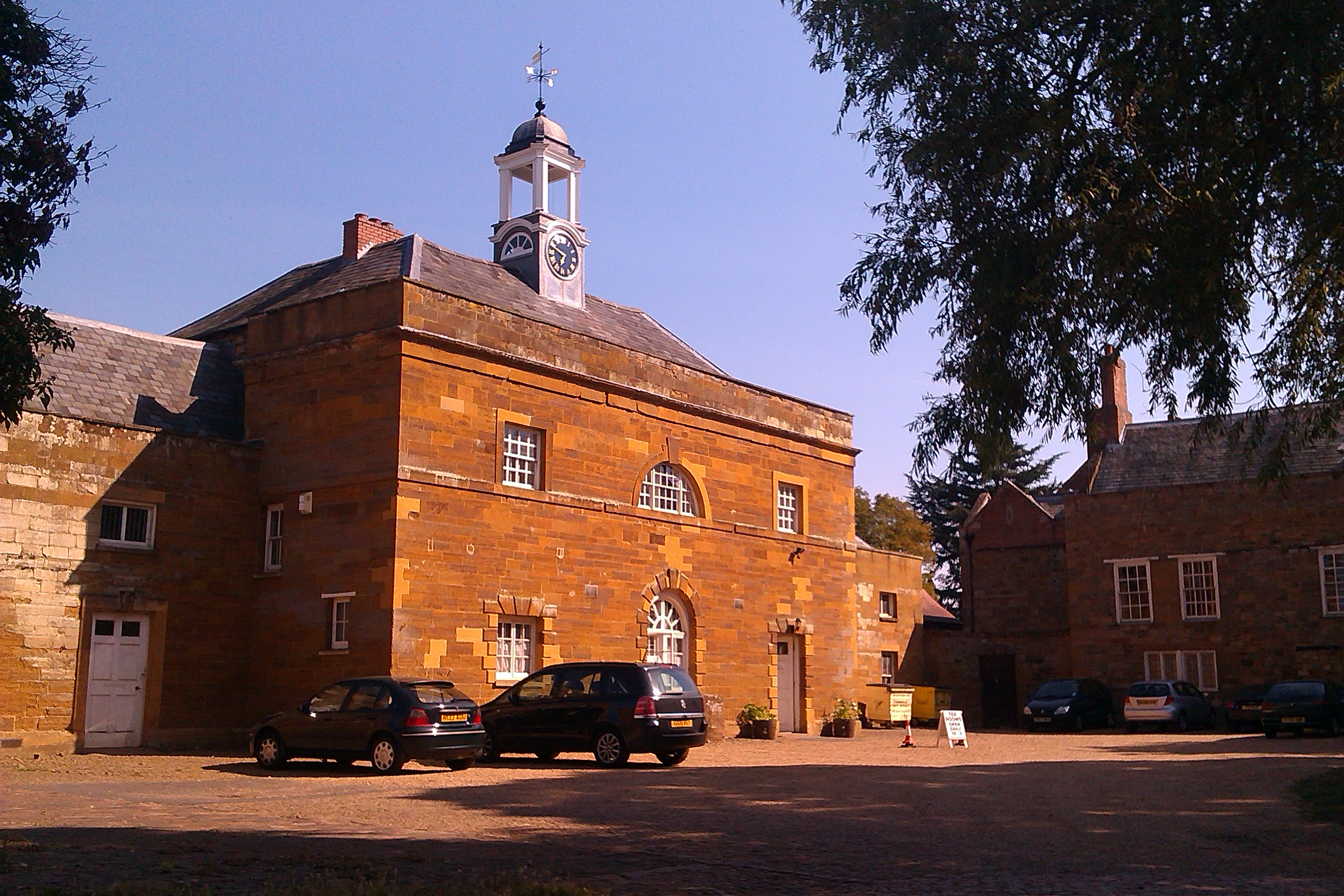
Stable Block of Delapré Abbey

- What remains consists of four ranges based around an almost square courtyard; probably remains of the earlier cloisters, with the passage around the north, west and east sides being the former cloister walks.
- The thicker walls found in the northern part of the main building are probably part of the walls of the church of the abbey. Almost nothing of the medieval buildings remain; two small recesses found in the cloister walk may have been used for keeping candles at night.
- What is visible is the result of work that started with the passing of the house in three phases, spanning the 16th to 18th centuries and much 19th-century redecoration.
- The stables at the northern end of the property date from around 1750–1765. They were renovated in 1971 by John Goff, then County Architect.

The present Delapré Abbey, standing in a fine park, has undergone so many alterations that it is not possible to give a connected history of its development, but it retains quite a considerable amount of ancient work.

=== Restoration ===
Following the success of a Heritage Lottery Fund application in 2013, a £6.3 million restoration project began in 2016. The Delapre Abbey Preservation Trust will manage the Abbey, which opened to the public for the first time in 900 years on 17 March 2018.

=== Grounds ===
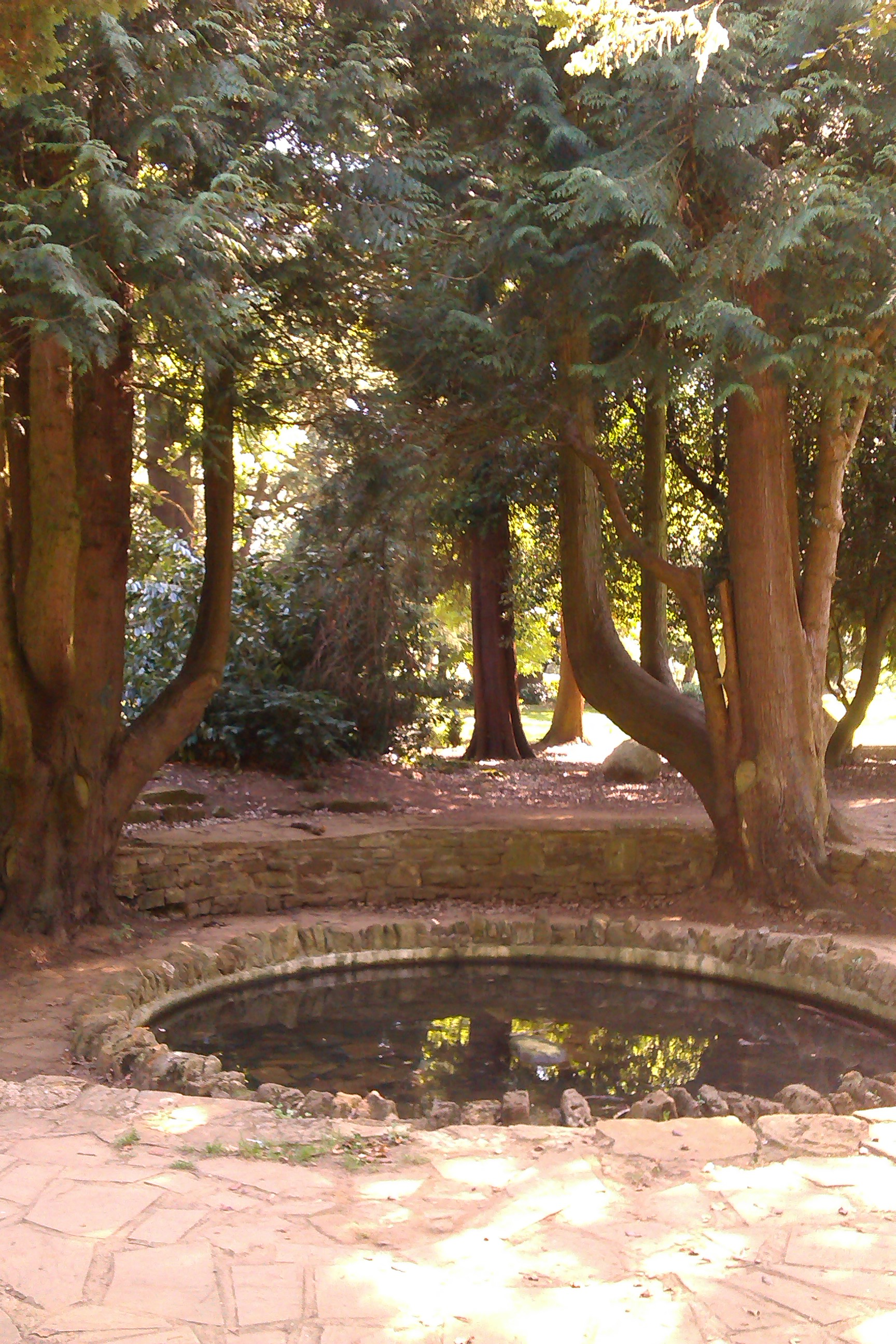
Ornamental Rock & Water Gardens in Delapre Park

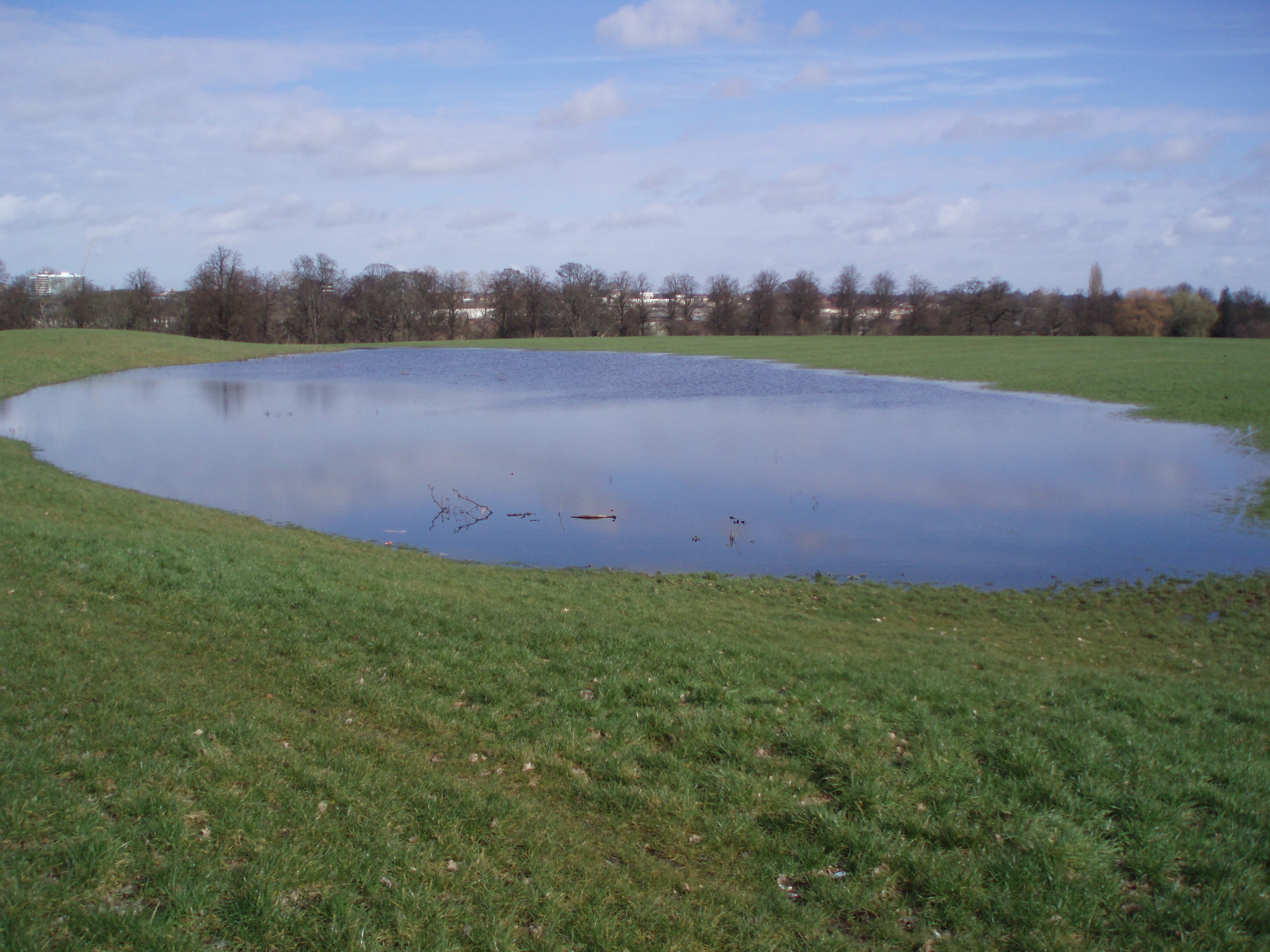
A flood lake caused by bunding

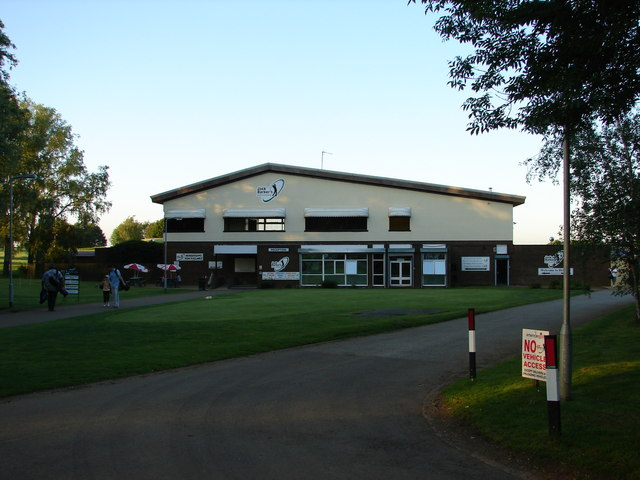
Delapre Golf Centre Clubhouse

There are about 500 acres (2.0 km^{2}) of parkland and 8 acres (32,000 m^{2}) of more formal gardens. Ornamental features include:

- A ha-ha
- A lake
- Delapré Abbey
- Delapré Woods
- Rock and water gardens
- Tree sculptures

Part of the estate has been developed as the public Delapré Golf Course.

Northampton Borough Council (NBC) added bunding to the London Road side of the grounds to prevent unauthorised vehicular access to the grounds. In the wet spring of 2007, this caused a flood lake to appear, which was condemned as dangerous to the public. In November 2006, NBC's planning committee approved an application to remove the bunding but successive administrations have to date not provided funds to perform the work – despite public concerns over the flooding. The Homes & Communities Agency has since indicated an interest in using the bund material on a nearby housing development.

=== Formal garden ===
In 1977 and 1978 three sculptures were installed in the walled garden:

- "The Lady with Kittens" and "The Lovers", the work of Walter Ritchie, were donated to Northampton after being displayed at an exhibition of brickwork sculptures at The Building Centre, London. The large brick panels depict episodes in the life of the mythical Sarah Wellington-Gore.
- "Woman and the Fish" is a listed sculpture by Frank Dobson, one of UK's most respected sculptors. This was given to Northampton after the Festival of Britain in 1951. It previously stood in the Memorial Gardens in the town centre, where it had been vandalised. It was repaired and transferred to its current location after an appeal for funds to meet the high costs of restoration.
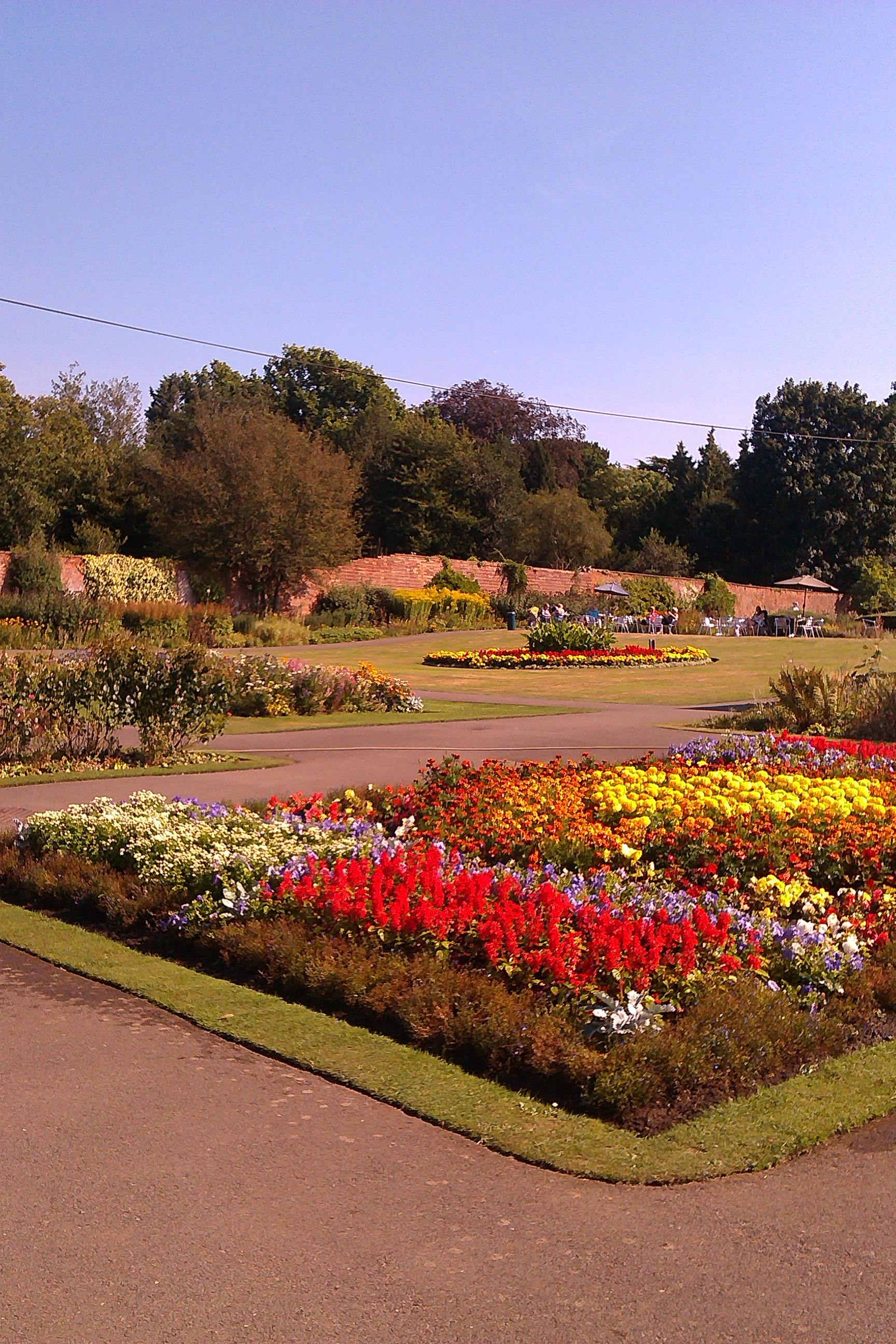
The formal garden from the entrance

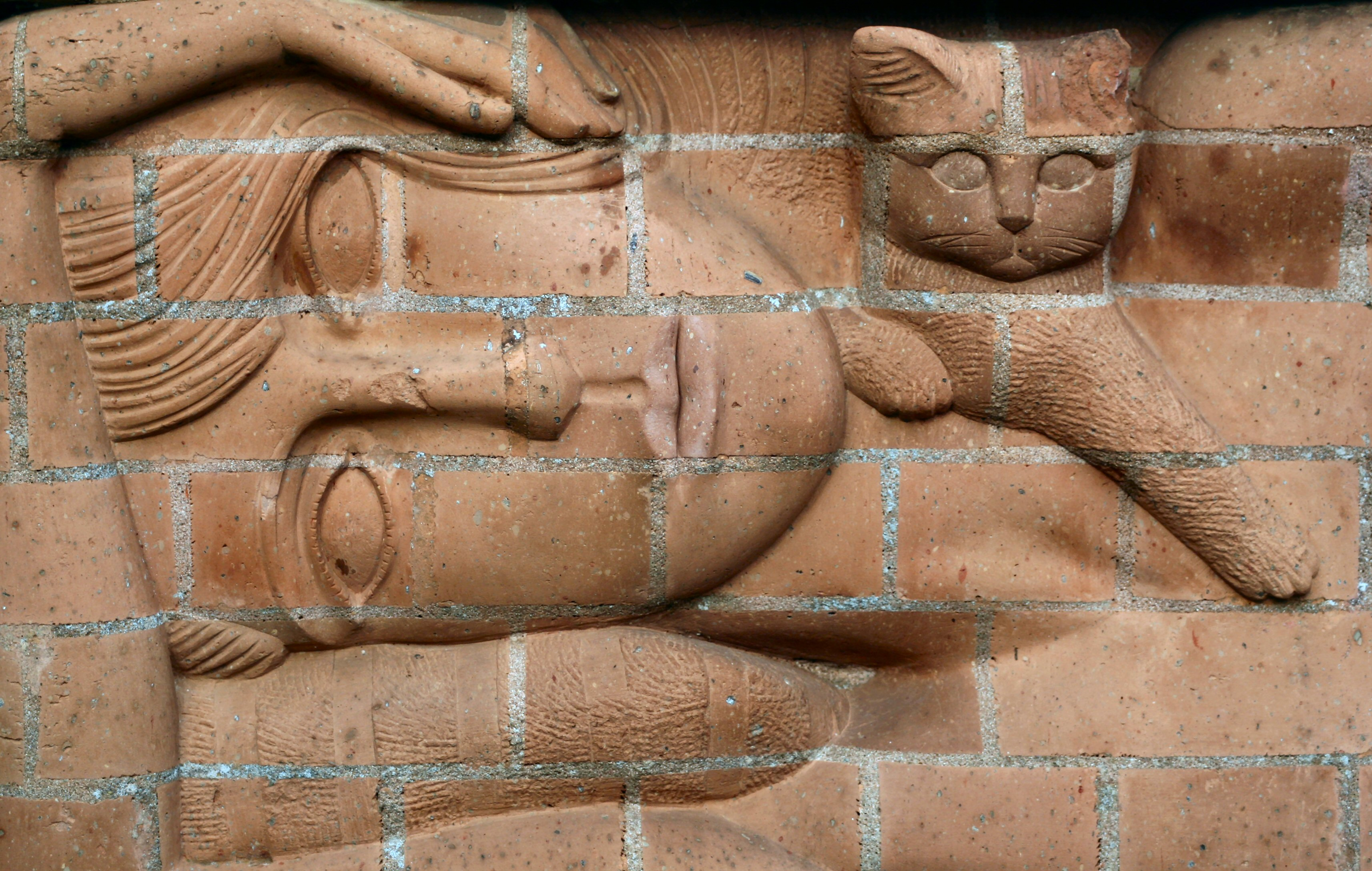
"Lady with Kittens" close up of the head

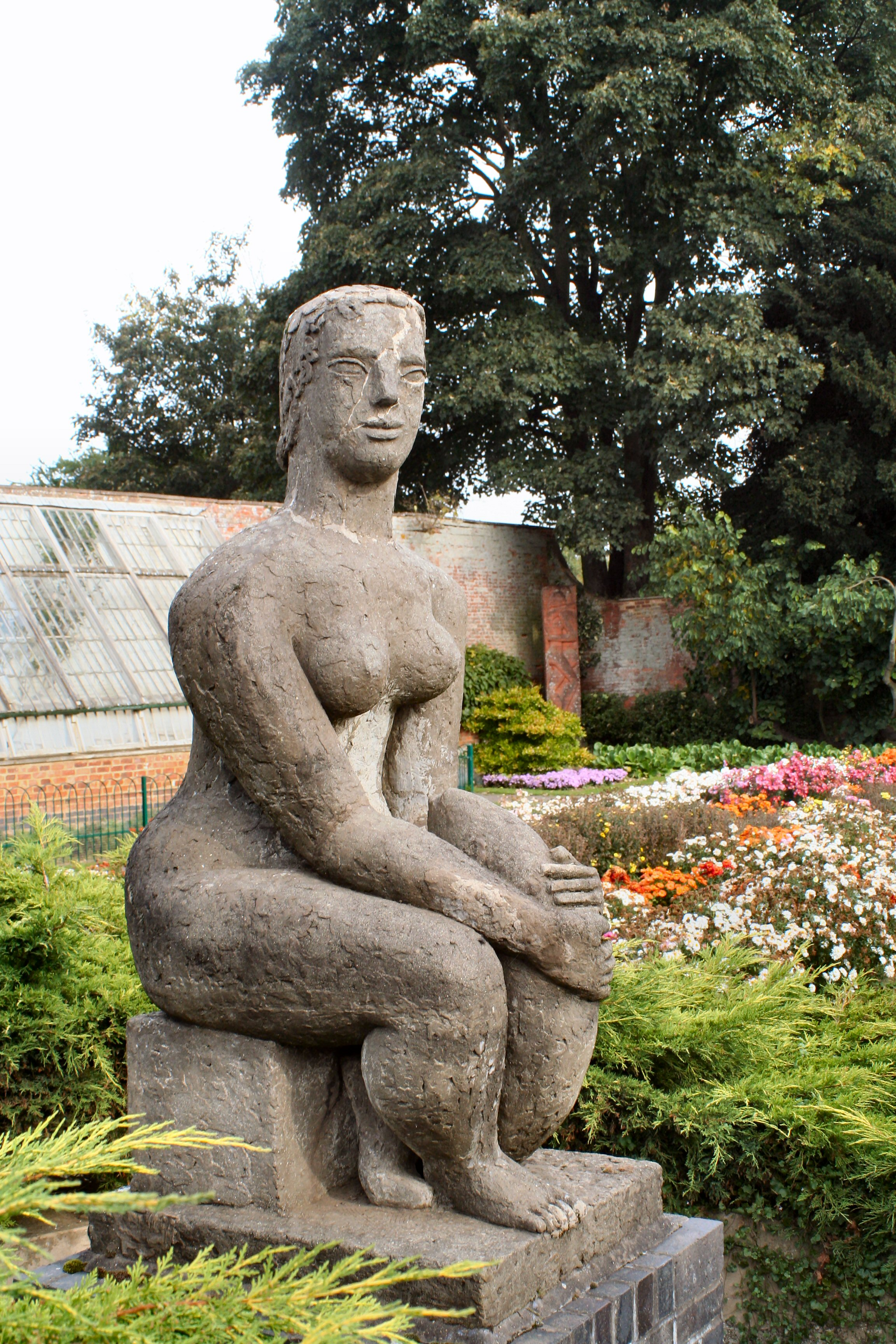
"Woman and the Fish" at Delapré

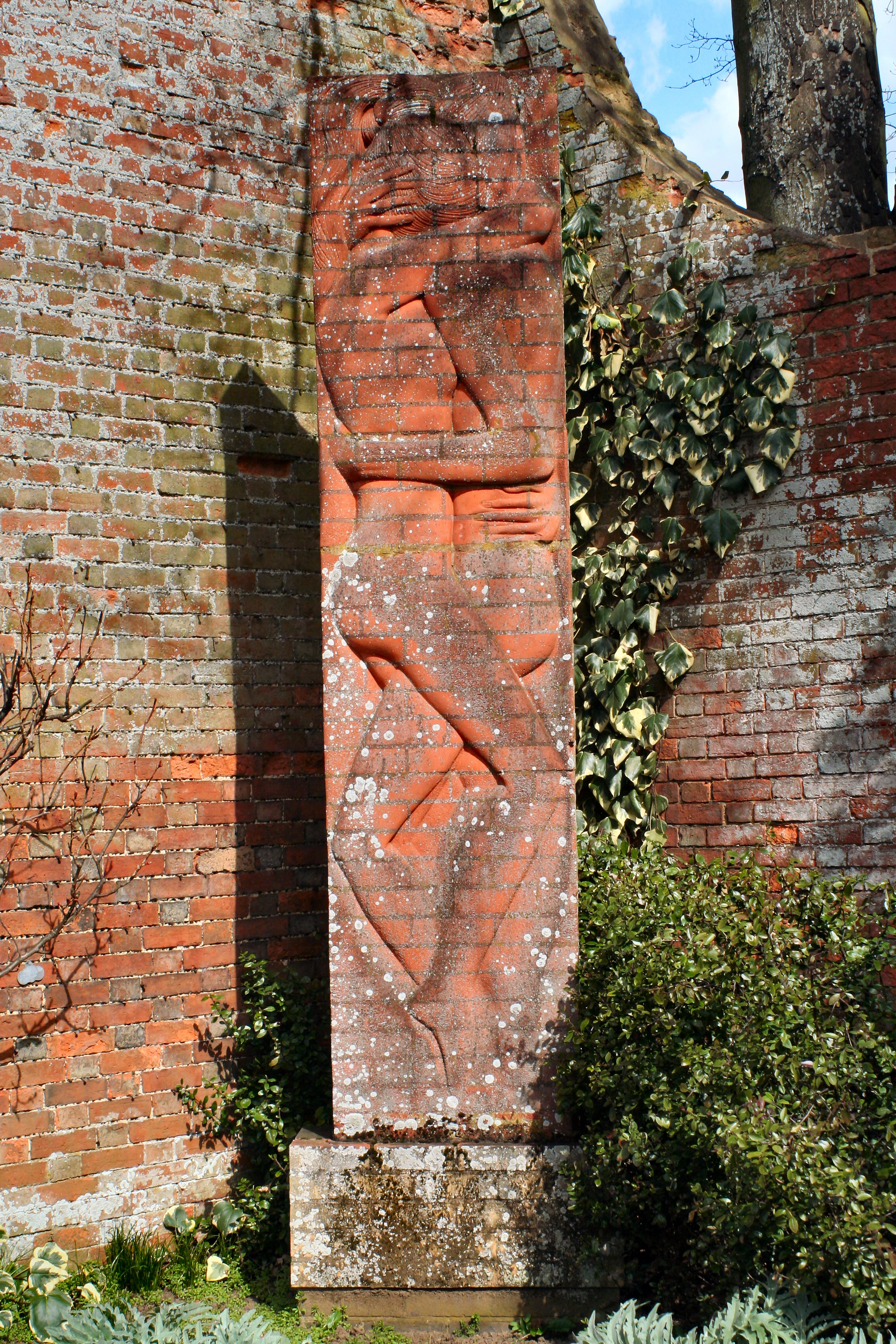
"The Lovers"

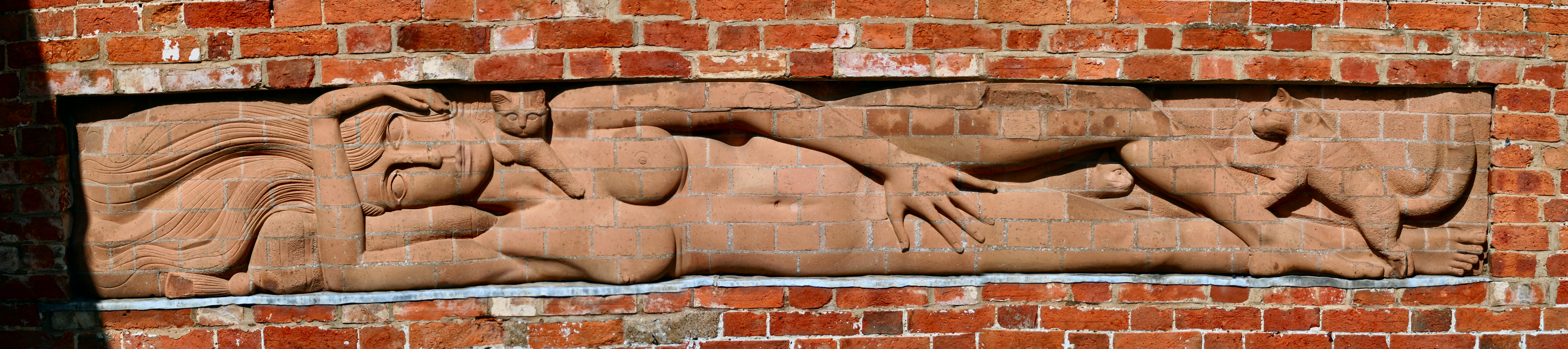
"the Lady with Kittens"
