= Grade II* listed buildings in Northampton =

There are over 20,000 Grade II* listed buildings in England. This page is a list of these buildings in the former district of Northampton in Northamptonshire, now part of the unitary authority area of West Northamptonshire.

== Northampton ==
Name	Location	Type	Completed (Note: The date given is the date used by Historic England as significant for the initial building or that of an important part in the structure's description.)	Date designated	Grid ref. (Note: The grid reference is based on the British national grid reference system, sometimes known as OSGB36, used by the Ordnance Survey.) Geo-coordinates	Entry number (Note: The "List Entry Number" is a unique number assigned to each listed building and scheduled monument by Historic England.)	Image
Church of All Saints	Little Billing, Billing, Northampton	Church	11th century	3 May 1968	SP8043861782; 52°14′54″N 0°49′24″W	1039721	Church of All Saints More images
20 High Street	Great Billing, Billing, Northampton	House	1703	3 May 1968	SP8115862758; 52°15′25″N 0°48′45″W	1039643	Upload Photo
Church of St Columba	Collingtree, Northampton	Church	15th century	3 May 1968	SP7508755721; 52°11′41″N 0°54′10″W	1293721	Church of St Columba More images
Church of St Mary the Virgin	Great Houghton, Northampton	Church	1754	3 May 1968	SP7918358977; 52°13′24″N 0°50′32″W	1039647	Church of St Mary the Virgin More images
Great Houghton House	Great Houghton, Northampton	House	c. 1830	3 May 1968	SP7935058709; 52°13′15″N 0°50′23″W	1372217	Upload Photo
The Manor House	Great Houghton, Northampton	House	1672	3 May 1968	SP7932958995; 52°13′24″N 0°50′24″W	1039729	Upload Photo
Church of St Edmund	Hardingstone, Northampton	Church	Early 13th century	3 May 1968	SP7634757803; 52°12′47″N 0°53′02″W	1039756	Church of St Edmund More images
26 and 28 Back Lane	Hardingstone, Northampton	House	Early 19th century	22 January 1976	SP7668558035; 52°12′55″N 0°52′44″W	1039730	Upload Photo
Church of Saint Peter	Weston Favell, Northampton	Parish Hall	1972	9 December 1968	SP7884661896; 52°14′59″N 0°50′47″W	1294161	Church of Saint Peter More images
Church of Saint Peter and Saint Paul	Abington Park, Northampton	Gate Pier	1820s	19 January 1952	SP7752961497; 52°14′46″N 0°51′57″W	1189663	Church of Saint Peter and Saint Paul More images
Church of St Mary	Dallington, Northampton	Church	12th century	19 January 1952	SP7378061797; 52°14′58″N 0°55′15″W	1039692	Church of St Mary More images
Church of St Mary the Virgin	Northampton	Church	1885	9 December 1968	SP7491159256; 52°13′35″N 0°54′17″W	1052413	Upload Photo
Church of St Matthew	Northampton	Church	1946	9 December 1968	SP7673362137; 52°15′07″N 0°52′39″W	1039661	Church of St Matthew More images
Church of St Stanislaus and St Lawrence	Northampton	Church	1877–1878	9 December 1968	SP7575861201; 52°14′38″N 0°53′31″W	1190310	Church of St Stanislaus and St Lawrence More images
Church of the Holy Trinity	Northampton	Church	1909	9 December 1968	SP7548562519; 52°15′20″N 0°53′44″W	1039732	Upload Photo
County Hall	Northampton	House	18th century	9 December 1968	SP7549160418; 52°14′12″N 0°53′45″W	1039665	County Hall More images
Cromwell House	Northampton	House	1662	19 January 1952	SP7504060403; 52°14′12″N 0°54′09″W	1372208	Cromwell House More images
Delapré Abbey	Northampton	Abbey	16th century	9 December 1968	SP7594459085; 52°13′29″N 0°53′23″W	1039791	Delapré Abbey More images
Judge's Lodgings	Northampton	House	18th century	19 January 1952	SP7552860436; 52°14′13″N 0°53′43″W	1039663	Upload Photo
Kingsthorpe Hall	Kingsthorpe, Northampton	House	1775	19 January 1952	SP7496262847; 52°15′31″N 0°54′11″W	1039757	Upload Photo
Margaret Spencer Home of Rest (Dallington Hall)	Northampton	House	1720–1730	30 September 1969	SP7374561783; 52°14′57″N 0°55′16″W	1372199	Upload Photo
New Ways	Northampton	House	1925–1926	19 January 1952	SP7789861941; 52°15′01″N 0°51′37″W	1052387	New Ways More images
St Andrew's Hospital (front Block and Wings only)	Northampton	Hospital	c. 1837	9 December 1968	SP7700860592; 52°14′17″N 0°52′25″W	1372186	Upload Photo
Northampton Guildhall	Northampton	Guildhall	1861–4	19 January 1952	SP7558060487; 52°14′15″N 0°53′41″W	1052399	Northampton Guildhall More images
32 and 32a Market Square	Northampton	House	Last qtr 17th century	19 January 1952	SP7549860611; 52°14′19″N 0°53′45″W	1293593	Upload Photo
8, 8a, 9 and 9a George Row	Northampton	House	Altered	9 December 1968	SP7547060417; 52°14′12″N 0°53′47″W	1039667	Upload Photo
78 Derngate	Northampton	Terraced House	Early 19th century	22 January 1976	SP7589760285; 52°14′08″N 0°53′24″W	1040369	78 Derngate More images
Edgar Mobbs War Memorial	Northampton	War memorial	1921	27 July 2017	SP7609460840; 52°14′26″N 0°53′13″W	1447457	Edgar Mobbs War Memorial More images
