= County Cricket Ground, Northampton =

Cricket ground in Northampton, England

cinch County Ground
- Wantage Road
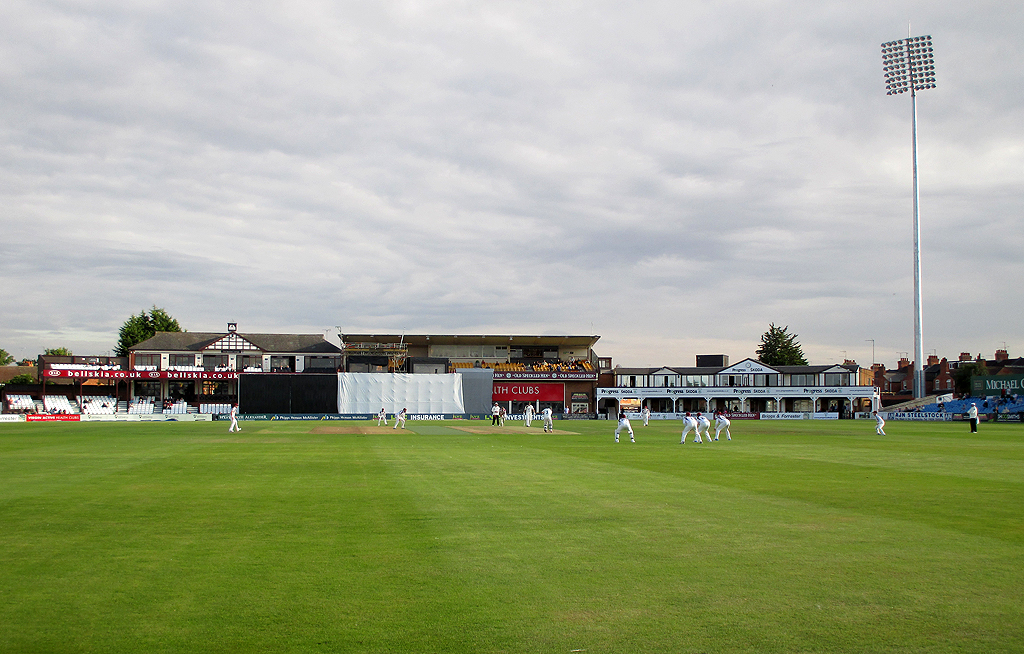
- County Ground in September 2014
- Interactive map of cinch County Ground

Ground information
- Location: Northampton
- Country: England
- Coordinates: 52°14′53″N 0°52′16″W
- Establishment: 1885
- Capacity: 6,500
- End names
- Lynn Wilson End David Capel End

International information
- First men's ODI: 19 May 1999: South Africa v Sri Lanka
- Last men's ODI: 31 May 1999: Bangladesh v Pakistan
- Only women's Test: 12–15 June 1937: England v Australia
- First women's ODI: 9 July 1999: England v India
- Last women's ODI: 12 September 2023: England v Sri Lanka
- First women's T20I: 22 August 2008: England v South Africa
- Last women's T20I: 17 May 2024: England v Pakistan

Team information
Northamptonshire	(1905–present)
Northampton Town	(1897–1994)
- As of 17 May 2024; Source: CricketArchive

The cinch County Ground, historically known as the County Ground and also known as Wantage Road, is a cricket venue on Wantage Road in the Abington area of Northampton, England. It is home to Northamptonshire County Cricket Club, and was used by Northampton Town F.C. from 1897 to 1994. In 2026, Northamptonshire County Cricket Club announced that the ground would be officially renamed the cinch County Ground under a six-year naming-rights agreement with cinch.

== Cricket ==
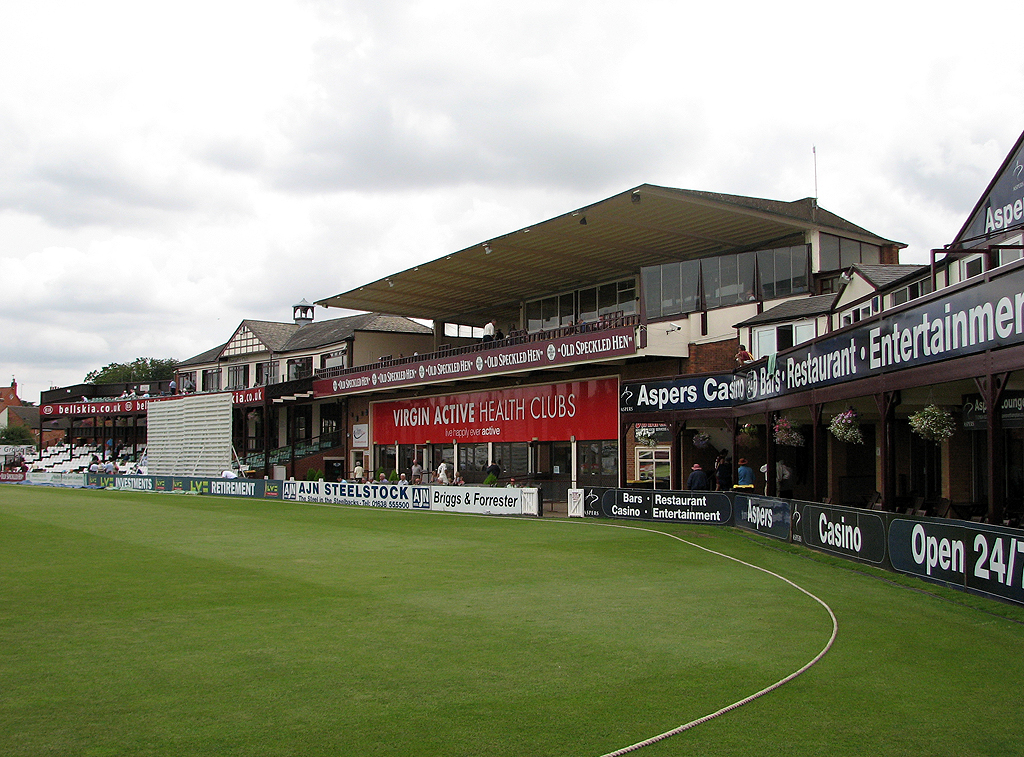
The Pavilion End in 2012

Northamptonshire played their first match at the ground in 1886 before competing in the Minor Counties Championship competition between 1895 and 1904, winning the title three times. They were accepted into the County Championship and played their first first-class match at the ground on 5 June 1905. Northamptonshire drew with Leicestershire in a rain-hit match that only permitted 75 overs of play.

The County Cricket Ground is known to be a venue which favours spinners, and in the last County Championship game of 2005, Northamptonshire's two spin bowlers Jason Brown and Monty Panesar took all 20 wickets for Northamptonshire.

The County Ground hosted two 1999 Cricket World Cup matches: South Africa's victory over Sri Lanka and Bangladesh's first World Cup victory against eventual finalists Pakistan by 62 runs.

== Football ==
Northampton Town F.C., also known as 'the Cobblers', played their home games at the County Ground for 97 years, between 1897 and 1994. The football ground only had three sides, with an open side being needed due to the size of the cricket field.

The team began in the Northants League, working upward through various leagues before being elected to The Football League in 1920. The team played in all four main divisions during their tenure at the County Ground. Between 1958 and 1965 the team rose from Division 4 all the way to the top tier, the First Division, where they stayed for only one season – 1965–66. Subsequently, the team fell into decline, being relegated to the Fourth Division in 1970 and have played in the third and fourth tiers of the English league ever since.

On 7 February 1970, Northampton Town hosted Manchester United in the FA Cup fifth round at the County Ground and lost 8–2, with George Best scoring six goals.

From the 1970s to the 1990s, the team occupied Division 3 and Division 4, finishing at the bottom of the league in 1994. However, they stayed in the league because the stadium at Kidderminster Harriers, the Football Conference winners, did not meet the standard required for promotion. By that stage, however, construction work on the new all-seater Sixfields Stadium had started. The new stadium was still under construction when the 1994–95 season began, and so the club began that season still at the County Ground.

The Cobblers played their last game there on 12 October 1994 (a 1–0 league defeat to Mansfield Town), and then moved to Sixfields, a four-sided stadium more suitable for football.

== Rugby Union ==
The county ground was previously used by Northampton Saints on a couple of occasions in the early 1900s, as well as for the East Midlands Rugby Union side, most notably in 1924 when they played the touring All Blacks side.

== Trivia ==
Sir Elton John played the first ever concert at the County Ground on 25 June 2011. The show lasted for over two and a half hours. Sir Elton was supported by Ed Drewett. Subsequent concerts have included Tom Jones, Olly Murs, Little Mix and Craig David/Rita Ora.

While the two sports clubs shared the ground, the cricket club's address was 'Wantage Road' whereas the football club's address was 'Abington Avenue'.

== See also ==
- List of cricket grounds in England and Wales
