= Cavalier Parliament =

Parliament of England (1661–1679)

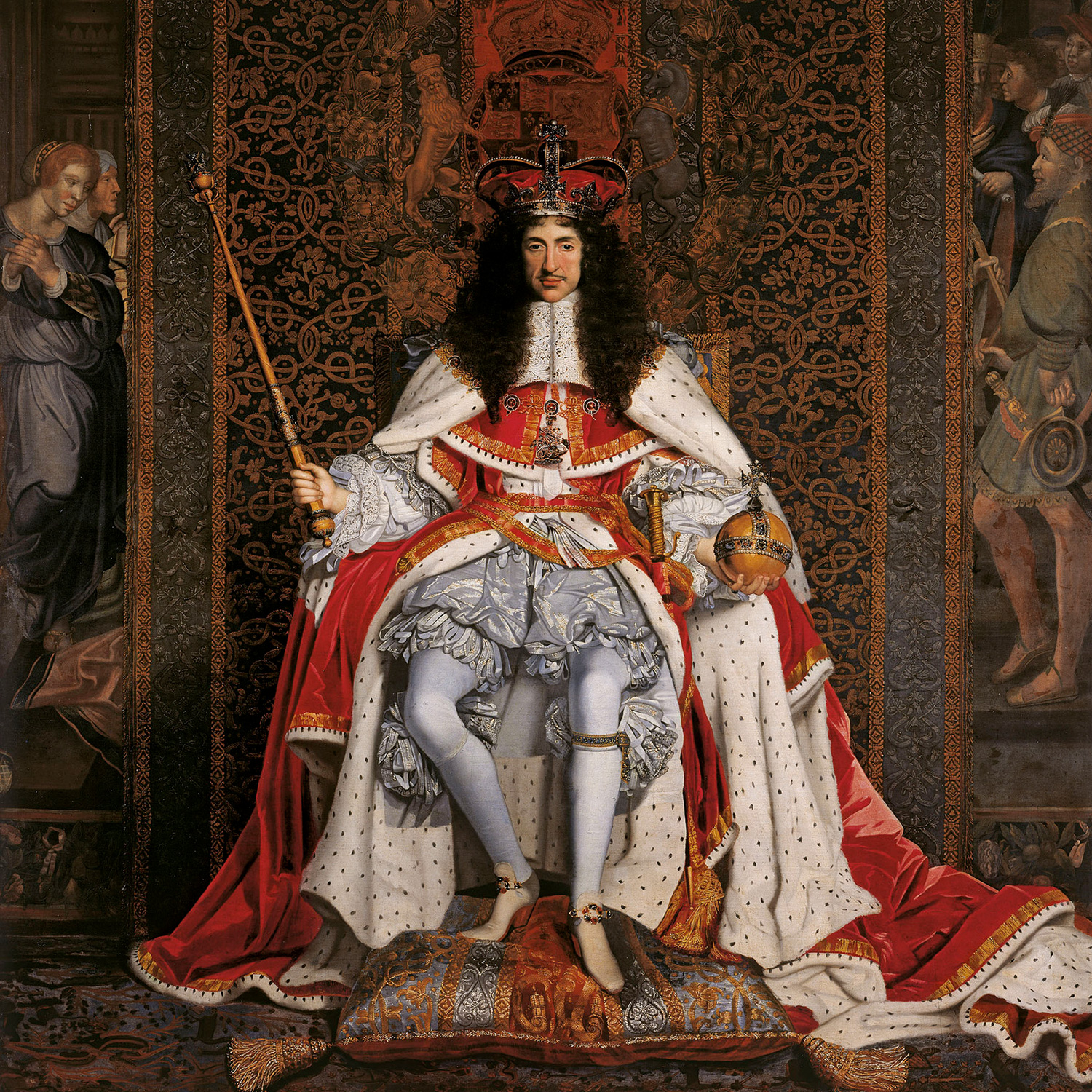
King Charles II of England, c. 1661–62, with his parliamentary robes, as he would have dressed at the opening of the sessions of the Cavalier Parliament.

The Cavalier Parliament of England lasted from 8 May 1661 until 24 January 1679. It is the second longest-lasting English Parliament, behind the Long Parliament, and sat longer than any Great British or UK Parliament to date, enduring for nearly 18 years of the quarter-century reign of Charles II of England. Like its predecessor, the Convention Parliament, it was overwhelmingly Royalist, composed mostly of Cavaliers (as opposed to the Roundheads), and is also known as the Pensioner Parliament for the many pensions it granted to adherents of the King.

== History ==
=== Clarendon ministry ===
The first session of the Cavalier Parliament opened on 8 May 1661. Among the first orders of business was the confirmation of the acts of the previous year's irregular Convention of 1660 as legitimate (notably, the Indemnity and Oblivion Act). Parliament immediately ordered the public burning of the Solemn League and Covenant by a common hangman. It also passed the Clergy Act 1661 which repealed the Clergy Act 1640 (16 Cha. 1. c. 27) of 1642, thereby allowing Church of England bishops to resume their temporal positions, including their seats in the House of Lords. Other notable pieces of first session legislation include the Militia Act placing the armed forces unambiguously under the king's authority, and the Sedition Act 1661. It also continued proceedings against the regicides of Charles I.

Later the same year, Parliament passed the Corporation Act 1661, the first of a series of acts known as the Clarendon Code, to cement the episcopal Anglican church as the official church of England. The Clarendon code is normally given as the following four acts:

- the Corporation Act 1661
- the Act of Uniformity 1662
- the Conventicle Act 1664
- the Five Mile Act 1665.

The Quaker Act 1662, specifically targeting Quakers, can also be cited as part of the new religious 'code'. In January 1661, the Fifth Monarchists, anticipating the arrival of Jesus Christ to claim the throne, led a succession of revolts under the command of Vavasor Powell and Thomas Venner. To silence radical agitators and pamphleteers, Parliament passed the Licensing of the Press Act 1662, instituting government censorship of the press.

On the economic legislation, the Cavalier parliament had a notable Mercantilist bent. To promote the English cloth industry, it outlawed the exportation of raw materials, such as wool, raw hides and fuller's clay (1662) and forbade the importation of finished materials like lace and embroidery (1662). It repealed old domestic restrictions on linen manufacturing (1663). To encourage the development of the American colonies as raw-material producers and consumers of English manufactured goods, the Cavalier parliament confirmed and reinforced the Navigation Act 1660 (12 Cha. 2. c. 18) passed by the prior parliament in 1660, with the new Encouragement of Trade Act 1663 (15 Cha. 2. c. 7), requiring foreigners trading with the American colonies to transship their goods through English ports. Old corn laws were adjusted to the advantage of English farmers: the old restrictions on the exportation of wheat was gradually relaxed, exportation becoming fully free in 1670 and even subsidized with bounties after 1673. Conversely, the importation of wheat was restricted, with the first prohibitive tariffs on the importation of grains introduced in 1663 in a two-tier system, adjusted (1670) into a three-tier system based on current price. The importation of Irish cattle into Britain was forbidden in 1666 by the Importation Act 1667 (19 & 20 Cha. 2. c. 12), giving English beef producers a protected home market (in trade, Scotland was already excluded altogether, treated as a foreign country on par with France). To facilitate the overseas operations of the charter companies, Parliament inserted a clause into the Encouragement of Trade Act 1663 (15 Cha. 2. c. 7) allowing the free exportation of coin and bullion – over the vigorous opposition of Arthur Annesley (Earl Anglesey), the leading mercantilist in Parliament. To encourage the inflow of gold and silver from abroad and into circulation, the Coinage Act 1666 abolished seignorage, and introduced free minting at the Royal Mint.

The prior Convention of 1660 had promised King Charles II a generous annual revenue of £1.2 million, secured on customs duties and excise taxes. It was up to Cavalier parliament to ensure that the promise was kept. But in the first few years, the revenue fell short of the promised amount, and Parliament had to look for new ways to make up for it. Parliament was responsible for the introduction of the controversial hearth tax (1662), with its unpopular and intrusive method of assessment (tax collectors had to go inside everyone's private homes to count hearths). Another problem also emerged at this time: the sudden rise in the number of paupers, which had catapulted with the demobilization of the army. It was feared they would migrate en masse to the better-off parishes and swamp their social assistance programs. So, in another controversial piece of legislation, Parliament changed the Elizabethan Poor Laws with the Poor Relief Act 1662, legally restricting the poor to seeking assistance in their own home parish.

Other significant and curious pieces of early legislation include the first licensing of hackney carriages (1662), an act against "excessive gaming" (1663) and a famous 1663 act authorizing the erection of toll gates on the Great North Road, the prelude to a series of acts to help finance road-building for highways.

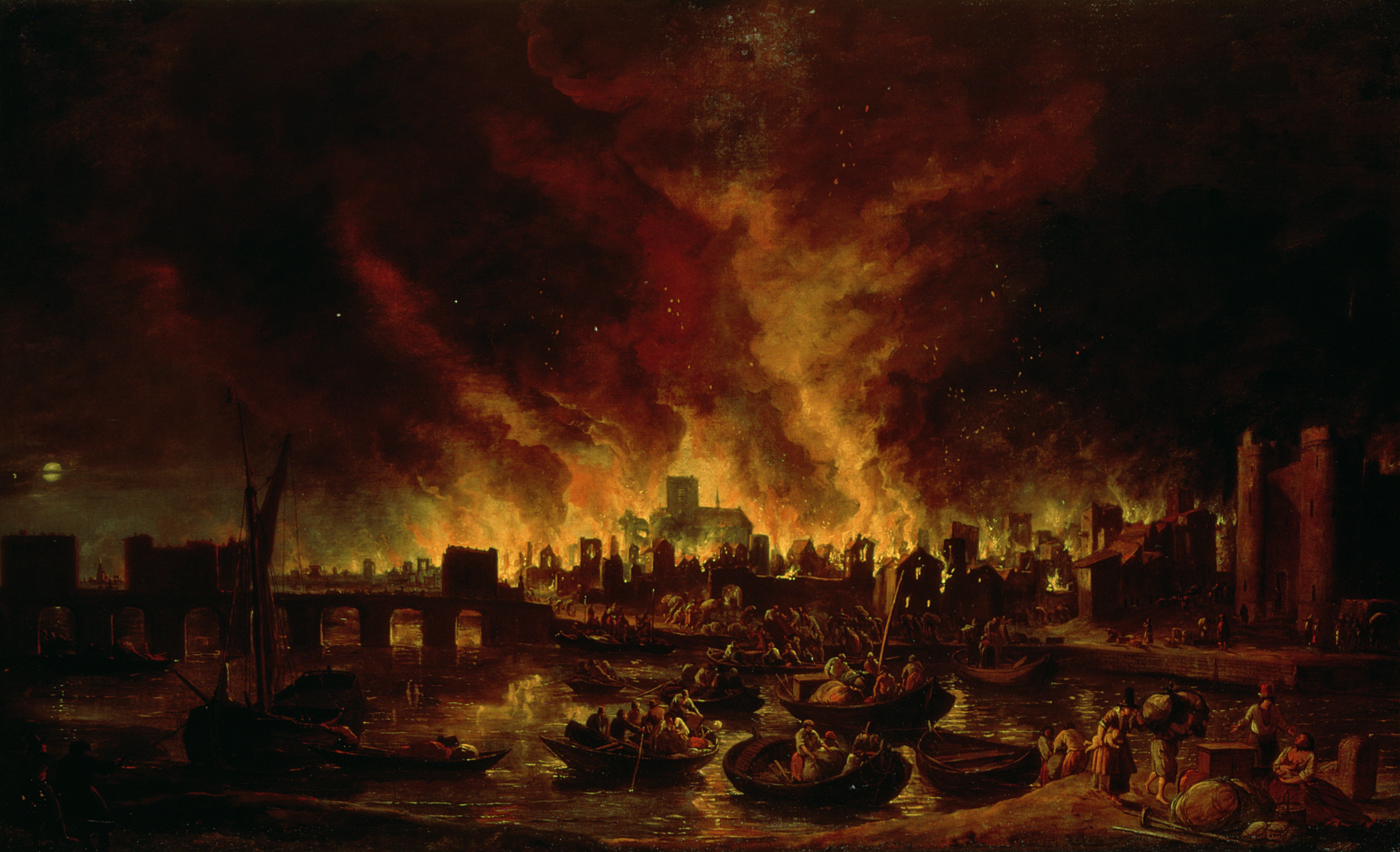
Great Fire of London.

In 1664, the Cavalier parliament amended the old Triennial Act 1660 (16 Cha. 1. c. 1) so that it was now only suggested (rather than required) that the king summon a parliamentary session at least once every three years. In 1665, Parliament met in Oxford to escape the Great Plague of London. The next year, in the aftermath of the Great Fire of London which ravaged the city in September 1666, Parliament set up a court to settle disputes between landlords and tenants of burned buildings (Fire of London Disputes Act 1666), and passed a series of acts setting down regulations for rebuilding of the city (Rebuilding of London Act 1666).

Mercantilist agitation had prompted Parliament to support the Second Anglo-Dutch War in 1665. But when the war turned out poorly in 1667, Parliament decided to lay the blame on Charles II's chief minister Edward Hyde (Earl of Clarendon) and the king's brother and lord admiral, James, Duke of York. Parliament, echoing public belief, accused that the money voted for the war had been embezzled by court officers. Under pressure, Charles consented to setting up an independent commission for inquiry, but the verdict was inconclusive. Nonetheless, Parliament decided to launch impeachment proceedings against Clarendon. Before these bore fruit, Clarendon went into exile.

=== Cabal ministry ===
Clarendon's departure opened the way for the rise of a new crop of young ministers, known as "the Cabal", a loose ministerial coalition consisting of Clifford, Arlington, Buckingham, Ashley, Lauderdale. The beginnings of what is now called a cabinet system began to emerge within the government. Sir George Downing, who had long stressed parliamentary prerogative in tying expenditures to specific sources (rather than just voting for supply and letting the crown allocate as it saw fit), became secretary to the Treasury, and helped overhaul crown finances, finally putting them on a steady course.

Nonetheless, parliament was shocked when, in 1668, the Cabal announced the "Triple Alliance", which brought England into alliance with her recent enemy, the Dutch Republic. Although a league of northern Protestant powers had some appeal, mercantilist sentiment in parliament was still very strong, and the Netherlands was still seen as the main threat to England. Disillusioned by the lukewarm reception, Charles II re-oriented his foreign policy and struck up the notorious secret Treaty of Dover in May 1670, allying England and Louis XIV's France, in a plan to dismember the Netherlands.

Despite their comparative energy and efficiency, the Cabal were a fractious and unpopular lot and their infighting spilled over publicly into parliament, particularly the House of Lords. At this stage, the House of Commons was de facto subservient to Lords, "managed from above" by the Lords' handlers, following their lead and echoing their quarrels. But Commons soon began to find its own voice. Finding the Cabal insufferable, Sir William Coventry resigned as Secretary to the Admiralty and went back to the House of Commons, where he emerged in 1669 as the formidable leader of a group of parliamentarians known as the "Country Party" – a group of MPs held together by their suspicion of corruption in high places, suspicious of the king's dubious foreign policy and, increasingly, suspicious of his loyalty to Protestantism. The factions of a "party political" system thus gradually emerged in parliament, polarised between the Coventry-led "Country Party" (ancestral to the Whigs) and the "Court Party" (supporters of the king's council, ancestral to the Tories).

The new self-assurance of Commons was felt in a quarrel that erupted during the 9th Session in 1670 between Lords and Commons, where Commons assailed the Lords' assumption that they had the right to amend their revenue bills. Finding their handlers could no longer control Commons, and that the goodwill that had attended Charles II at the Restoration was wearing thin, the Cabal recommended doing without them, and persuaded Charles II to keep parliament out of session with repeated prorogations.

The Third Anglo-Dutch War (begun in April 1672), however, soon forced Charles II's hand. While parliament was prorogued, the Cabal had unwisely engineered the "Great Stop of the Exchequer" in January 1672, redirecting the revenues designated for the paying of government debt towards financing a new fleet for the upcoming war. The default prompted the goldsmith bankers of London to cease all further credit to the crown, forcing Charles II to finally call parliament again in early 1673 for its 10th Session to plead for funds. By this time, the war was not going very well, and English public sentiment, which had originally been itching for revenge on the hated Dutch, now swung firmly against it. Facing the Anglo-French onslaught, the Dutch republic had delivered itself into the hands of the charismatic young stadtholder William III of Orange, Charles's own nephew. English public opinion (encouraged by Dutch propaganda) embraced the image of the heroic young Protestant prince valiantly defying an "international Catholic conspiracy" (uncomfortably close to the truth, given the secret Treaty of Dover). The Cabal defended the war vigorously – Ashley making his famous "Delenda est Carthago" speech before the House of Lords, comparing England to Rome and Holland to Carthage (an unusual classical reference for this audience). But Commons wanted to address a different item of business—the Declaration of Indulgence that had been issued by Charles II during the recess in 1672 suspending penal laws on Dissenters and Catholics. Parliament's opposition to this was not merely a spasm of religious intolerance. The Declaration effectively suspended an act of Parliament, and the MPs were eager to emphasize the constitutional point that an act which was passed in session could only be modified, suspended or repealed in session. They also saw religion as a means to break the hated Cabal – which contained both crypto-Catholics like Arlington and Clifford and crypto-Presbyterians like Ashley and Lauderdale. Parliament believed the Cabal had been responsible for keeping them out of session and counselling to king to govern without them. To that end, parliament used its purse-strings to force not only the repeal of the Declaration but also the passage of the first Test Act in May 1673, requiring all office-holders to deny Catholic transubstantiation and take Anglican communion.

Following the Test Act, the members of the Cabal gradually resigned or were dismissed. Rather than submit to the Test, Clifford and, more significantly the king's own brother and heir apparent, James Duke of York, resigned their offices. James's refusal caught the public by surprise – and signalled the prospect that Charles II might be succeeded by a Catholic king. Through the late Summer of 1673, apprehension about James's Catholicism was the talk of the day. When the next session opened in October 1673, Ashley (now Earl of Shaftesbury), sensing the new mood, turned up at the House of Lords to loudly denounce the proposed marriage of James of York to the Catholic princess Mary of Modena. The king angrily prorogued the session and dismissed Shaftesbury. Around that same time, Arlington and Buckingham fell into a quarrel, in the process of which the details of the secret Treaty of Dover were leaked to parliament, provoking an alarmed parliamentary inquiry. Arlington and Buckingham sheepishly appeared before the inquiry in January 1674, accusing each other of crafting the French alliance. His foreign policy in shambles, Charles II decided to pull England out of the controversial war. In February, Charles II took the unprecedented step of communicating the terms of the Treaty to Westminster to parliament before it was signed.

=== Danby ministry ===
With the fall of the Cabal (only Lauderdale lingered on in Scotland), Charles II turned to Thomas Osborne (Earl of Danby) as his chief minister. The House of Commons, which had played a significant role in the events of 1673, was comparatively calmed by Danby's orthodox Anglican government and vigorous enforcement of the Test Act. But the drama now shifted to the House of Lords, where the dismissed Ashley-Shaftesbury, in alliance with the disgruntled Buckingham and George Savile (Viscount Halifax) (Coventry's nephew), emerged as leader of the opposition to the government. In the House of Commons, the Country Party gained strength with the adherence of talented MPs like William Russell, William Cavendish, Henry Powle, Thomas Littleton and John Birch and coordinated their actions in Commons closely with Shaftesbury's Lords.

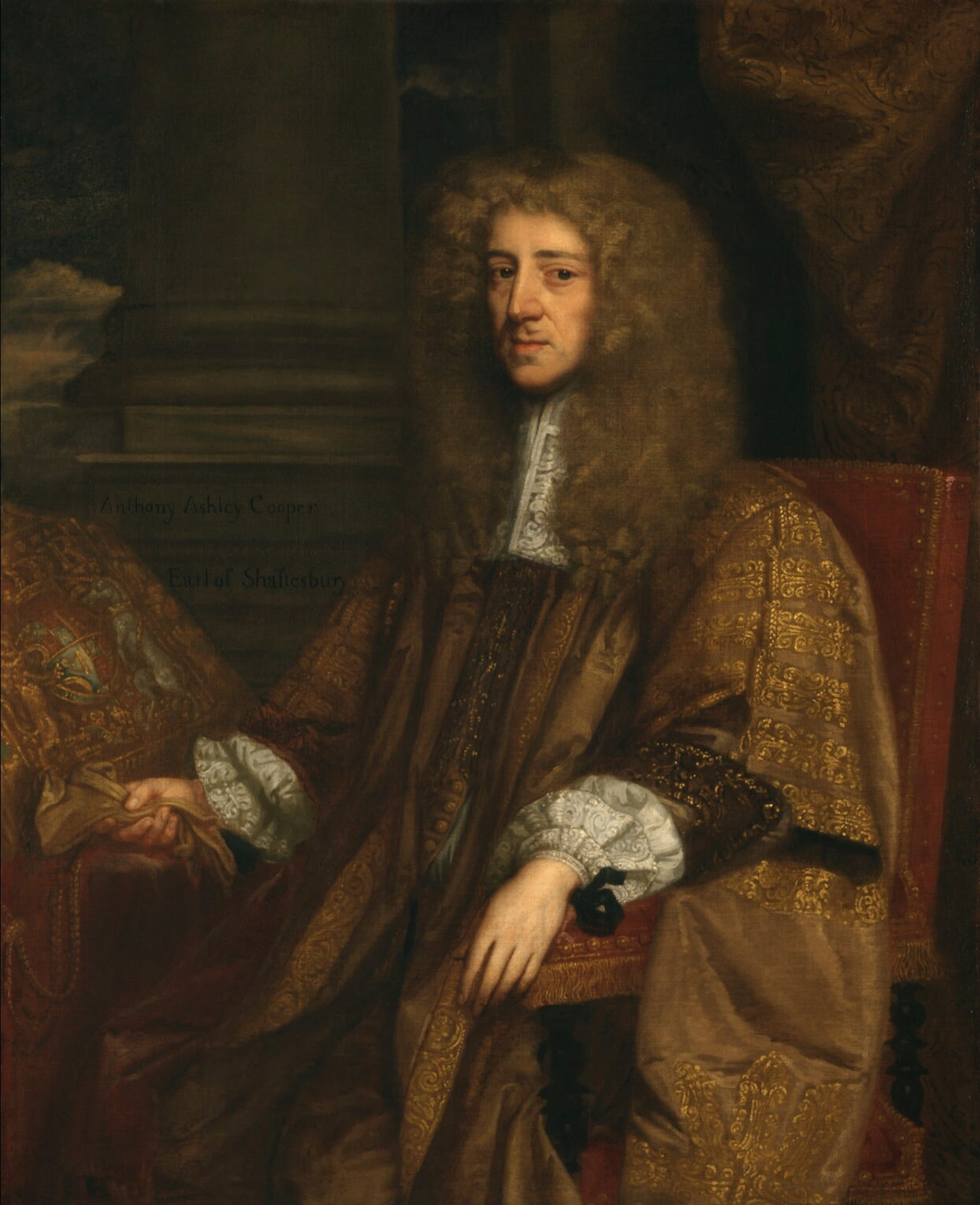
Anthony Ashley-Cooper, Earl of Shaftesbury, c. 1672–73.

Through the brief 12th session of early 1674, Shaftesbury and his friends, flexing their new muscles, steered a slew of provocative bills in the House of Lords, e.g. expelling Catholics from London, forcing an oath that renounced the Pope, requiring royal family members to get parliamentary consent on marriage and how to raise their children. Finally when Shaftesbury's clique begin considering bringing James of York on charges of high treason, Charles II quickly prorogued the session, preventing the session's act from being passed. The next year's sessions of 1675 went little better: Shaftesbury led an attempt to impeach Danby, following the defeat of Danby's proposed legislation to reinforce the Test Act with a new oath forswearing any attempt to "modify" the Church and State. The impeachment effort came to naught, but Danby responded to the opposition's new muscle with a strenuous effort to construct a "Court Party" in the House of Commons to counter the Country Party (Danby's generous bribes to MPs caused the Cavalier Parliament to also be known as the "Pensionary Parliament").

After these calamitous sessions, Charles II prorogued parliament in November 1675 and kept it out of session for the next fifteen months (the "Long Prorogation"). When parliament resumed in February 1677, it opened with a bang. Shaftesbury (joined by Buckingham, Salisbury and Wharton), proclaimed the session illegitimate, claiming that the "Long Prorogation" implied that parliament was effectively dissolved and that the king must call for new elections. This prospect alarmed the House of Commons, whose members (unlike Lords) risked losing their seats. The leaders of the Country Party in Commons believed their party would be strengthened by new elections, but were unable to persuade other members to follow suit. While the combative lords were sent to the Tower of London for their challenge, Commons were only willing to agree that the long prorogation was probably unconstitutional, but that the session itself was not.

The session of 1677 had been called by Charles II to finance England's re-entry into the Franco-Dutch War, which had been dragging on since England left in 1674, and hopefully get himself a seat at the peace table. Parliament was inclined, provided the king joined the Dutch side. To this end, Danby negotiated the marriage of James of York's eldest daughter Mary to the Dutch Stadtholder William III of Orange in November 1677. But parliament was unwilling to provide enough funds to raise an army. The memoirs of the French ambassador Paul Barillon d'Amoncourt reveal extensive French communication (and bribery) of the MPs to delay supply – even Country Party leaders like Henry Powle, William Harbord and Thomas Littleton were paid. This has led some historians to speculate that parliament's war-call was a bluff from the start, that they were more interested in denying the king a foreign policy victory and embarrassing Danby. Nonetheless, Charles II hurried things along in late 1677 by precipitously signing a treaty with William III to re-enter the war, and presenting it to parliament as a fait accompli. The reluctant parliament was forced to cough up enough funds to dispatch an expeditionary force of around 15,000 troops under the Duke of Monmouth to Flanders in May 1678. But it was too late – the French and Dutch quickly wound up their negotiations (without England), and went on to sign the Treaties of Nijmegen ending the war. In June, parliament quickly voted a sum to finance the disbanding of the expeditionary force, but Charles II decided to use the money to maintain it instead for a few months longer, in the hope he might still affect the final treaty.

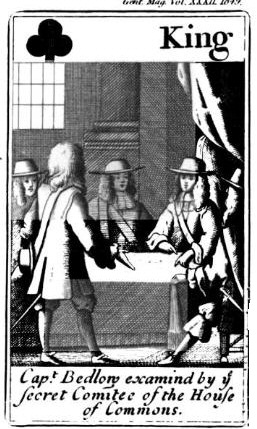
William Bedloe 'reveals' the Popish Plot to a committee of the House of Commons

This humiliating conclusion to the king's war policy dragged the political reputation of the King and Danby to a low point, making them vulnerable when the Popish Plot erupted in August and September 1678. When the 17th session opened that October, parliament was in a tremendously combative mood. Worked up by the Popish plot, they strengthened the Test Act with the Papists' Disabling Act excluding Catholics from both houses of parliament and the king's court (James exempted). Parliament also demanded to know why the king had misapplied the June funds and was still maintaining the expeditionary force in Flanders. The session was finally wrecked when details emerged that, on Charles II's instructions, Danby had entered into secret negotiations with Louis XIV in early 1676, promising England would not re-enter the war on the Dutch side, negotiations which had not been revealed during the 1677 debate. Parliament immediately impeached Danby, forcing Charles II to prorogue the session in December 1678.

In the recess, Charles II entered into negotiations with Shaftesbury and other parliamentary leaders. In return for saving Danby from trial in the House of Lords, Charles II reluctantly agreed to their demands to finally dissolve parliament and call for new elections. The dissolution was announced on 24 January 1679, bringing the seemingly interminable Cavalier Parliament to its end.

After the elections, the new parliament – known as the Habeas Corpus Parliament (or "First Exclusion Parliament") – was assembled in March 1679.

== Officers ==
In the first decade, the Speaker of the House of Commons was Sir Edward Turnour (MP for Hertford), who was elected by the first session in 1661. Turnour become Solicitor-General in 1670 and held the speakership until 1671 (end of 9th Session), after which he was appointed the new Chief Baron of the Exchequer. At the opening of the 10th Session (February 1673), Job Charlton (MP Ludlow) was elected as the new speaker, but resigned after a month on account of ill-health. Sir Edward Seymour (MP for Totnes and Treasurer of the Navy) replaced him, and served as Speaker until the 1678 session, when the speakership went to the Sir Robert Sawyer (MP for High Wycombe). But Sawyer resigned within weeks, also on account of health, and Seymour stepped in again as speaker until the end of the Cavalier parliament.

== Sessions ==
At the 1660 Restoration, the Commonwealth era was obliterated from the legal record, with the result that Charles II's regnal years officially begin on 30 January 1649 (the death date of Charles I). The Cavalier parliament thus officially begins on the thirteenth year of Charles II's reign.

The Cavalier parliament went through seventeen sessions, although some sessions were broken up by adjournments and recesses (an "adjournment" only interrupts a session; a "prorogation" ends a session, a "dissolution" ends a parliament).

By English tradition, a parliamentary session passes only one public "statute", albeit an act with various "chapters". English legal statutes are cited by parliamentary session labeled by the regnal year in which that session sat. So the citation "15 Cha 2. c. 4" means "the fourth chapter of the act passed by the parliamentary session that sat in the 15th year of the reign of Charles II". Charles II's regnal year begins on 30 January, so if a single parliamentary session overlaps that date, it will usually be given a double label, e.g. "19 & 20 Cha. 2" (the session that sat from the 19th to the 20th year of Charles II's reign). If there are two sessions within the same regnal year, they are differentiated by a "Statute" suffix (e.g. 13 Cha. 2. St. 1 is a different session than 13 Cha. 2. St. 2). Finally, some sessions were prorogued without passing an act, and thus have no legal statute label at all.

The legal titles of parliamentary sessions of the Cavalier parliament are as given in the two most prominent compilations of statutes – the popular Statutes at Large (ed. Owen Ruffhead, 1762–65 or Danby Pickering 1762–66) and the official The Statutes of the Realm (ed. John Raithby, 1819). We note where the title differs between the two compilations.

The session dates are sometimes incorrect in the rolls. This table largely follows the dating in Cobbett's Parliamentary History. (N.B. - In the 17th century, the English "legal year" began on 25 March, so an act which is passed, say, on 10 February 1663, will be officially dated 10 February 1662. This can be a cause of confusion. Cobbett notes the double date by a hyphen 1662–63, with the latter number as the historical calendar year. The table below follows the regular calendar dates.)

For the acts of parliament passed in each session, see:

- List of acts of the 1st session of the 2nd Parliament of King Charles II
- List of acts of the 2nd session of the 2nd Parliament of King Charles II
- List of acts of the 3rd session of the 2nd Parliament of King Charles II
- List of acts of the 4th session of the 2nd Parliament of King Charles II
- List of acts of the 5th session of the 2nd Parliament of King Charles II
- List of acts of the 6th session of the 2nd Parliament of King Charles II
- List of acts of the 7th session of the 2nd Parliament of King Charles II
- List of acts of the 9th session of the 2nd Parliament of King Charles II
- List of acts of the 10th session of the 2nd Parliament of King Charles II
- List of acts of the 13th session of the 2nd Parliament of King Charles II
- List of acts of the 14th session of the 2nd Parliament of King Charles II
- List of acts of the 15th session of the 2nd Parliament of King Charles II
- List of acts of the 16th session of the 2nd Parliament of King Charles II
- List of acts of the 17th session of the 2nd Parliament of King Charles II

Session	Label	Start	End	Note
1st session	13 Cha. 2. St. 1	8 May 1661	30 June 1661	adjourned
1st session (cont'd)	13 Cha. 2. St. 2	20 November 1661	20 December 1661	adjourned
1st session (cont'd)	13 & 14 Cha. 2 (S at Large); 14 Cha. 2 (S of Realm)	7 January 1662	19 May 1662	prorogued
2nd session	15 Cha. 2	18 February 1663	27 July 1663	
3rd session	16 Cha. 2	16 March 1664	17 May 1664	
4th session	16 & 17 Cha. 2	24 November 1664	2 March 1665	
5th session	17 Cha. 2	9 October 1665	31 October 1665	Held at Oxford
6th session	18 Cha. 2 (S at Large); 18 & 19 Cha. 2 (S of Realm)	21 September 1666	8 February 1667	
7th session	19 Cha. 2 (S at Large); 18 & 19 Cha. 2/19 & 20 Cha. 2 (S of Realm)	10 October 1667	19 December 1667	adjourned
7th session (cont'd)	20 Cha. 2 (S at Large); 19 & 20 Cha. 2 (S of Realm)	10 February 1668	9 May 1668	adjourned 9 May, adjourned in recess, 11 August adjourned in recess, 10 November prorogued in recess, 1 March 1669
8th session	N/A	10 October 1669	11 December 1669	No act passed, no label.
9th session	22 Cha. 2	14 February 1670	11 April 1670	adjourned
9th session (cont'd)	22 & 23 Cha. 2	24 October 1670	22 April 1671	prorogued 22 April 1671 next session prorogued in recess, 16 April 1672 next session prorogued in recess, October 1672
10th session	25 Cha. 2	4 February 1673	29 March 1673	adjourned, 29 March prorogued in recess, 20 October
11th session	N/A	27 October 1673	4 November 1673	No act passed, no label
12th session	N/A	7 January 1674	24 February 1674	No act passed, no label prorogued, 24 February next session prorogued in recess, 10 November
13th session	N/A	13 April 1675	5 Jun 1675	No act passed, no label
14th session	27 Cha. 2	13 October 1675	16 November 1675	"Long Prorogation" (15 months)
15th session	29 Cha. 2	15 February 1677	25 April 1677	adjourned
15th session (cont'd)	29 & 30 Cha. 2	28 January 1678	13 May 1678	
16th session	30 Cha. 2	23 May 1678	20 June 1678	
17th session	30 Cha. 2. St. 2	21 October 1678	30 December 1678	prorogued, 30 December Parliament dissolved 24 January 1679

== See also ==
- 1661 English general election
- List of MPs elected to the English Parliament in 1661
- List of acts of the Parliament of England
- Stuart Restoration
- List of parliaments of England
