= Great Fire of Northampton =

1675 fire in England

Coordinates: 52.23774°N 0.90218°W

Fire at Northampton (Property Disputes) Act 1675
- Act of Parliament
- Parliament of England
- Long title: An Act for the better and more easy rebuilding the Towne of Northampton.
- Citation: 27 Cha. 2. c. 1
- Territorial extent: England and Wales

Dates
- Royal assent: 22 November 1675
- Commencement: 13 October 1675 (Note: Start of session.)
- Repealed: 30 July 1948
Other legislation
Repealed by	Statute Law Revision Act 1948

Status: Repealed

Text of statute as originally enacted

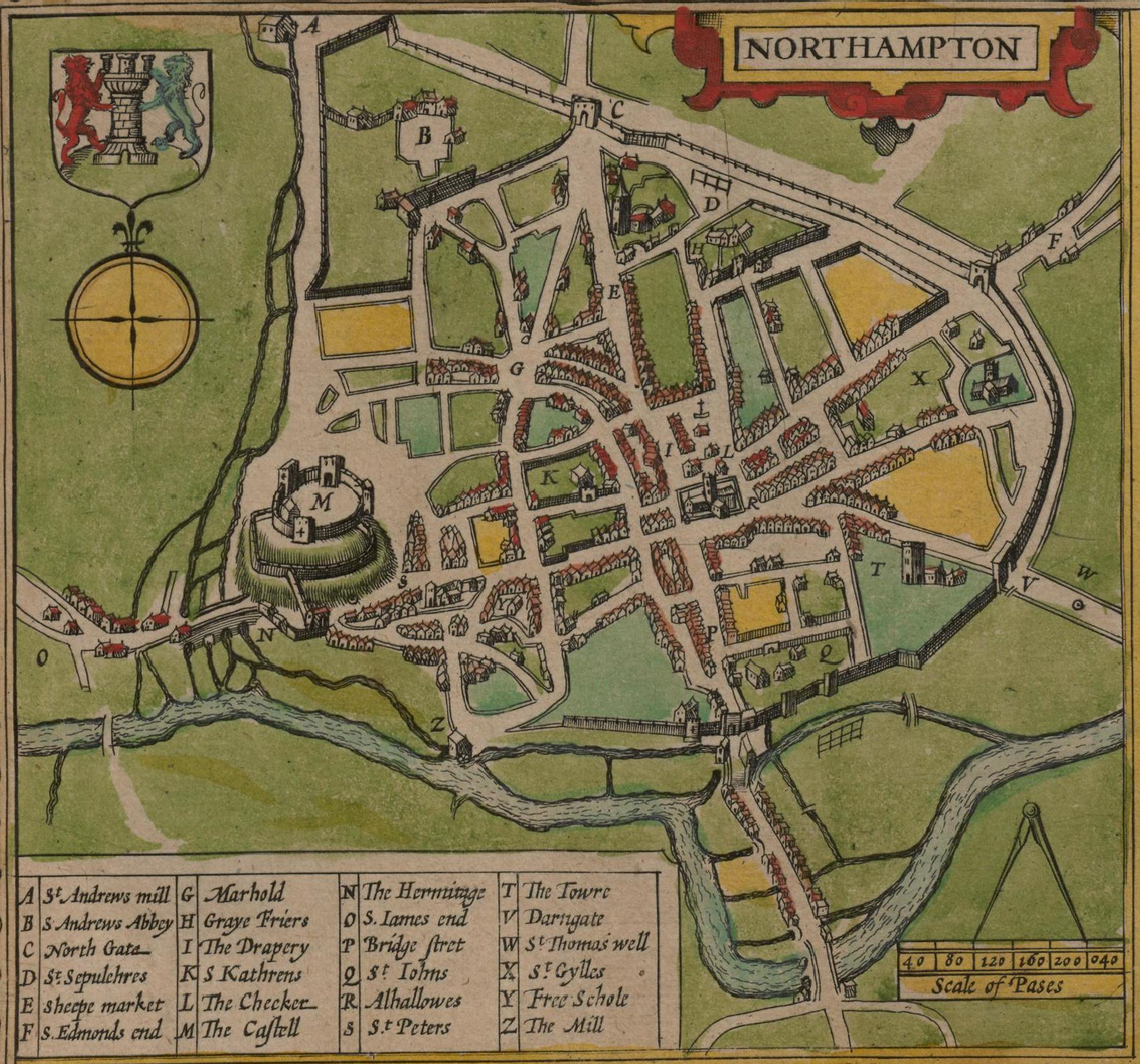
1610 map of Northampton, before the fire

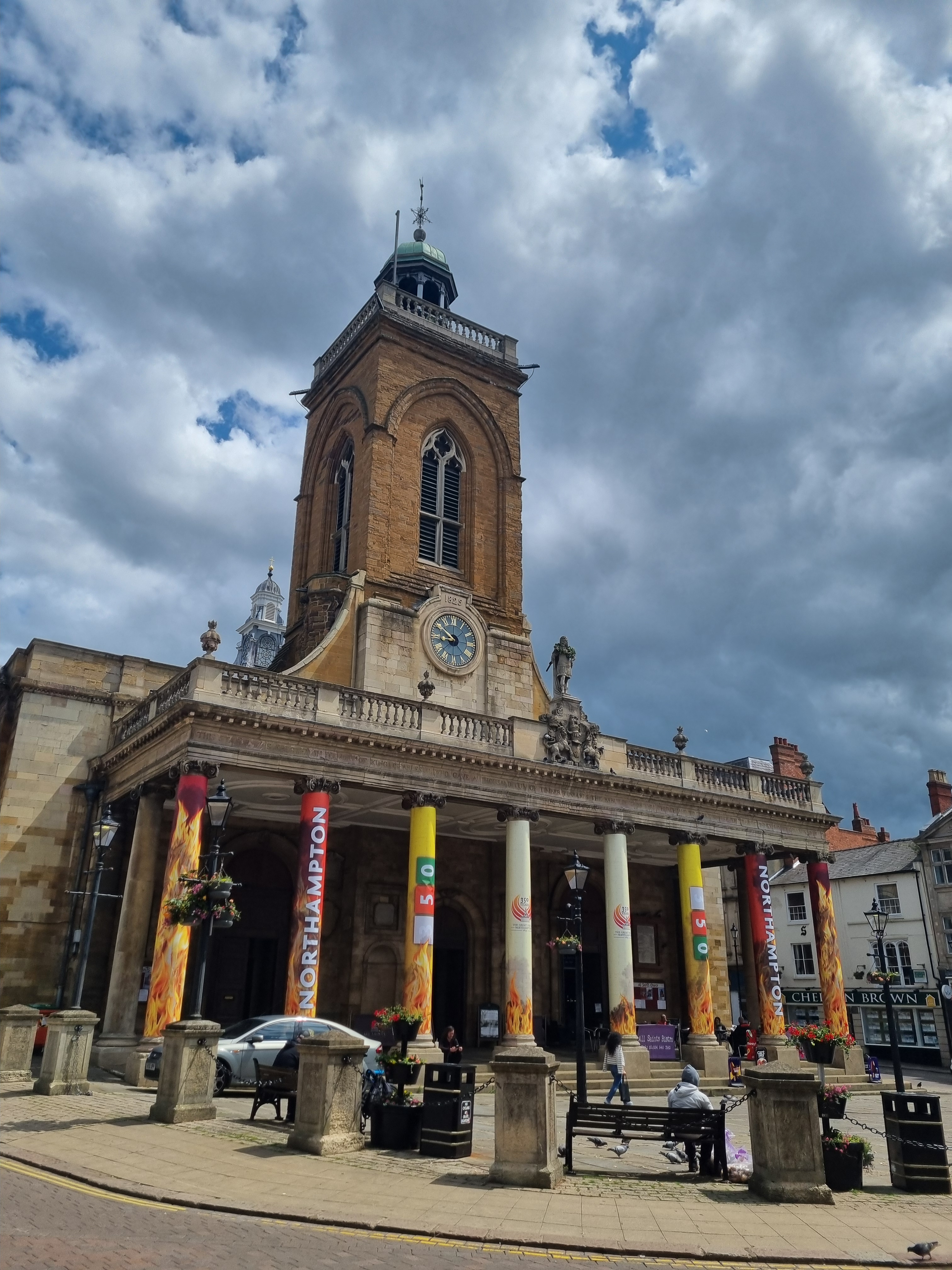
All Saints' Church, Northampton decorated to commemorate 350th anniversary of Great Fire of Northampton

The Great Fire of Northampton occurred on the 20th of September 1675 in Northampton in Northamptonshire, England. The blaze was caused by sparks from an open fire on St. Mary's Street, near Northampton Castle. The fire devastated the town centre, destroying about 700 of the town's 850 buildings, including All Saints church, in six hours. Three quarters of the town was destroyed, 11 people died and about 700 families were made homeless. Many people escaped the fire by going through Welsh House on the market square to safety.).

== Background ==
In 1675 Northampton was a small town of roughly 700 to 800 households, home to an estimated 4,500 people. The majority of its buildings were made of timber, wattle and daub and thatch, densely packed along narrow medieval streets, though a number of houses and churches were built of stone. The layout of the town was still largely dictated by the medieval walls, which had been pulled down in 1662 following the English Civil War, after which the castle was also slighted. The town's large market square was lined with closely built timbered housing, with combustible goods such as barrels of tallow and oil, corn ricks and fuel stacked ready for sale.

== The fire ==
The fire broke out on the morning of 20 September 1675 in a house on St Mary's Street, east of the castle, after a summer that had been unusually hot and dry. Contemporary accounts attribute the outbreak to a spark from an open fire, possibly in a property connected with a tallow candle-maker. An unusually strong westerly wind fanned the flames eastward towards the town centre and did not let up for around twenty-four hours.

The blaze spread across the Horse Market and College Street towards the Drapery and the Market Square. Townspeople initially stacked their belongings against the wooden market cross for safety, but the cross itself caught fire, helping the blaze to spread further. As the flames reached the Market Square, traders and residents were forced to escape through the stone-built Welsh House, the only building on the square not to burn down. The tower of All Hallows' Church acted as a chimney, drawing the fire upward, and the church was severely damaged. Large parts of the town were destroyed, including sections of Bridge Street, Abington Street, St Giles' Street and the Derngate.

Most of the destruction was done within the first few hours, with further outbreaks continuing until rain fell the following day. Sources vary on the scale of the losses: contemporary and heritage accounts state that around 600 homes were destroyed, while Northampton Town Council, marking the 350th anniversary in 2025, gave a figure of 700 of the town's 850 buildings. About 700 families were left homeless and eleven deaths are traditionally recorded, though some accounts suggest the fatalities resulted from falling masonry in the days after the fire rather than from the flames themselves. Estimates of the damage exceeded £150,000.

== Relief and rebuilding ==
Immediate relief was organised by the local landed elite. James Compton, 3rd Earl of Northampton, who is said to have seen the fire break out from Castle Ashby, sent provisions for the homeless, and nearby villages took in refugees. Richard Rainsford, the member of Parliament for Northampton, drew on his experience of the recovery following the 1666 Great Fire of London and within a week established a committee to receive subscriptions for rebuilding, attracting donations from landowners, institutions and towns across England.

King Charles II gave substantial support, providing money, tax relief, and the profits of several years of the chimney tax, and donating 1,000 tons of timber from Salcey Forest for the reconstruction. A tenth of the money collected for the town was allocated to rebuilding the church. Local people and businesses raised around £25,000 towards rebuilding the town centre around the Market Square, and streets were widened to help prevent a recurrence.

To resolve the many property disputes that arose in the aftermath, Parliament passed the Fire at Northampton (Property Disputes) Act 1675 ("An Act for the better and more easy rebuilding the Towne of Northampton"), which received royal assent on 22 November 1675. The Act was repealed in 1948 by the Statute Law Revision Act 1948.

Much of the rebuilding was overseen by the King's Lynn architect Henry Bell, working with the London surveyor Edward Edwards. Bell is credited with the rebuilt All Hallows' Church, rededicated as All Saints', which was based on Christopher Wren's London church of St Mary-at-Hill and incorporated the surviving medieval tower and crypt; the new church opened in 1680. A portico was added in 1701, above which stands a commemorative lead statue of Charles II dressed in a Roman toga, marking his contribution to the rebuilding. Bell, in collaboration with Edwards, is also credited with the Sessions House on George Row (1676–1678), one of the first major buildings completed after the fire, following which the county gaol was moved from Northampton Castle.

In 1724, the town's new appearance inspired author and traveller Daniel Defoe to describe Northampton as the "handsomest and best built town in all this part of England... finely rebuilt with brick and stone, and the streets made spacious and wide".

== Legacy ==
The rebuilt town centre, dominated by All Saints' Church and the Market Square, remains a defining feature of Northampton. In September 2025, the town marked the 350th anniversary of the fire with a programme of exhibitions, events and community activities organised by Northampton Town Council, West Northamptonshire Council and local heritage groups.

The fire received fictional treatment in the second book of Northampton native Alan Moore's 2016 novel Jerusalem.

== See also ==
- Hazelrigg House – a historic Grade II listed house that escaped the fire.
