= St Peter and St Paul's Church, Abington =

- Church of St Peter and St Paul
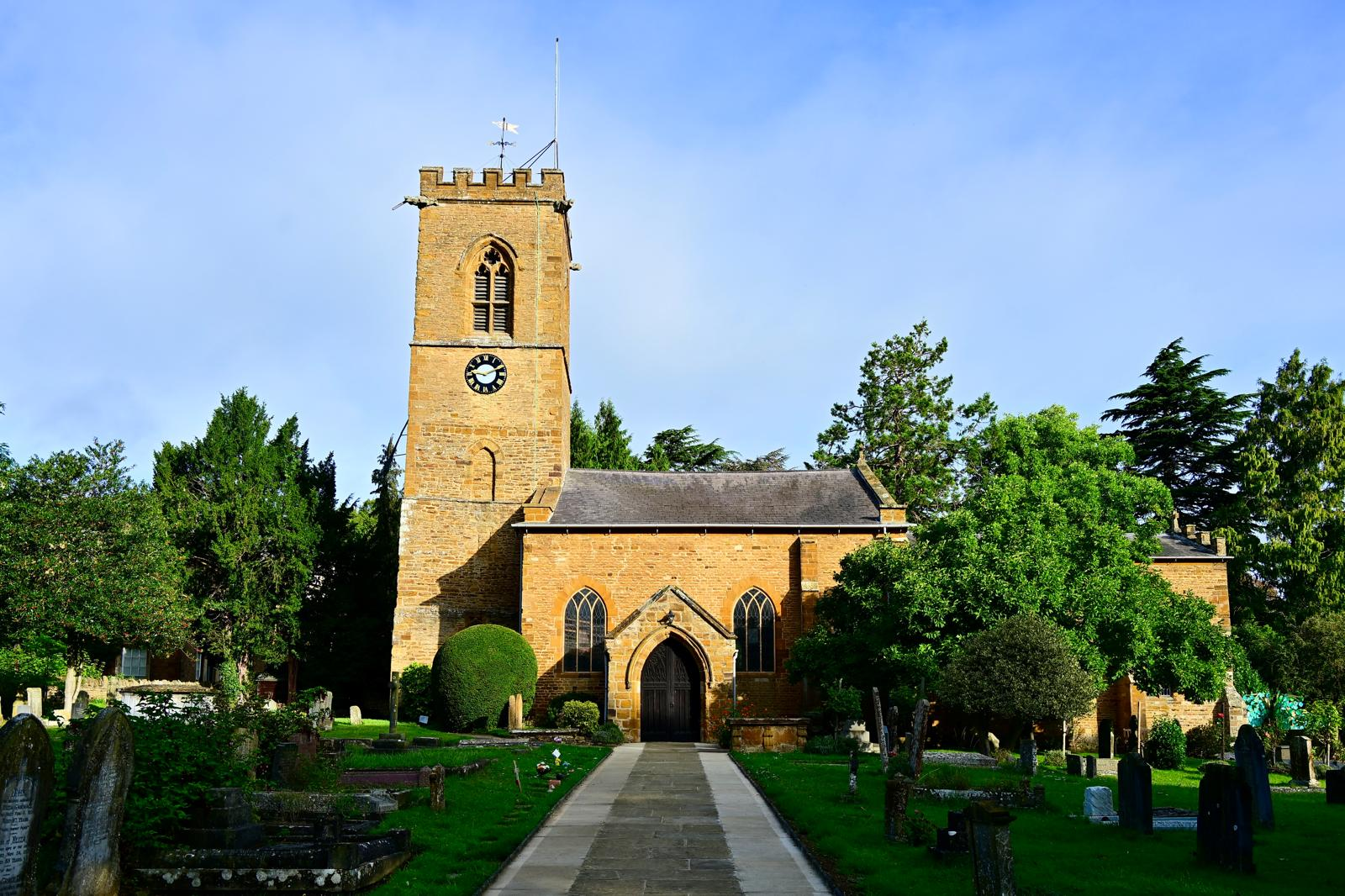
- St Peter and St Paul's Church, Abington
- 52.246251°N 0.865720°W
- Country: England
- Denomination: Church of England

History
- Status: Active
- Dedication: Saint Peter and Saint Paul

Architecture
- Functional status: Parish church
- Heritage designation: Grade II* listed
- Designated: 19 January 1952
- Architect: Charles Squirhill
- Style: Gothic, Gothic Revival

Administration
- Diocese: Peterborough

St Peter and St Paul's Church is a Church of England parish church serving the parish of Abington in Northamptonshire, England. It is dedicated to the apostles Peter and Paul. The church stands in the grounds of Abington Park, on the outskirts of Northampton. It is a Grade II* listed building.

== History ==
The church of St Peter & St Paul was founded at least 800 years ago as a place of worship for the inhabitants of the then-rural village of Abington. The village was depopulated by enclosure during the 18th century, though the church continued to tend to the religious needs of estate workers attached to the associated manor house of Abington.

By the end of the 19th century, the encroachment of Northampton meant the town now surrounded the estate. In 1897 the estate was gifted to the Northampton Corporation for use as a public park, with the manor house now serving as the premises of Abington Museum.

== Architecture ==
The oldest surviving part of the church is the west tower, which is stylistically dated to the late 12th century transitional period between Romanesque and Early Gothic styles. It retains it blocked lancet windows from this period. The chancel was lengthened in the 13th century and the aisles were probably rebuilt in the 15th century, when a piscina and sedilia were also installed. The church was refurnished in the late 17th and early 18th centuries.

The nave, aisles, and much of the east end collapsed during a storm in 1821. The architect Charles Squirhill was appointed to rebuild the nave on the old foundations, work completed in 1823. This produced the present wide, unaisled nave with timber Y-tracery windows. A late 12th-century doorway was reset in the south wall.

The church was restored in 1874, and given new vestries in 1938.

=== Fittings ===
The church's principal fittings include a three-seat late Perpendicular sedilia and a 15th-century octagonal baptismal font with carved roses, shields, and quatrefoils. The Royal coat of arms positioned above the tower arch are those of Charles II and date to c.1660. A pulpit of c.1700 is notable for being in the style of Grinling Gibbons, featuring cherubs, swags, and a large tester; the altar rails from the same date also survive.

20th century furnishings include a timber lectern from 1916 and a 1921 painted Gothic Revival reredos with carved Crucifix, a memorial to the dead of the First World War.

=== Stained glass ===
The primary east window was given as a memorial to John Harvey Thursby IV. Commissioned from the firm of Heaton, Butler and Bayne, it was installed in 1862. It shows Christ as the Good Shepherd in the central light, carrying the Lamb and Crozier. In the lights to either side are depictions of St Paul and St Peter.

The 1982 north chapel east window is a modern work designed by John Piper and made by Patrick Reyntiens. The three-light window depicts the Annunciation, with the Archangel Gabriel shown in the left light, a vase of white Easter lilies the focus of the centre light, and the Virgin Mary - unusually clothed in red - depicted in to the right. Piper's evidently took inspiration from Sandro Botticelli's 1489-90 tempera on panel painting of the Annunciation, now in the collection of the Uffizi in Florence, Italy.

In the south wall of the south chapel is a window given in memory of Victoria Stewart, who died in 1987. It depicts St Elizabeth and the infant John the Baptist to the centre, encircled by roses and vines. It was manufactured by Monastery Glass of Shutlanger, Northamptonshire.

=== Monuments ===
In the chancel are the remains of a 16th-century brass to William Mayle (d.1536) and his wife, Margaret (d.1567). The north chapel contains two 17th-century chest tombs to Sir Edmund Hampden (d.1627) and his wife, Elinor (d.1634). A leger slab in the south chapel remembers Sir John Bernard, onetime owner of Abington and briefly Member of Parliament for Northampton. His wife Elizabeth, Lady Bernard (née Hall, formerly Nash) was the granddaughter and last surviving descendent of William Shakespeare and Anne Hathaway. In the 20th century a memorial to Lady Bernard was unveiled in the north chapel.

Numerous monuments remember members of the Thursby family, who resided at Abington from 1669 until 1841. The largest and most ambitious is to Judge William Thursby, d. 1730, which was carved by Samuel Cox I. Thursby also served as Member of Parliament for Northampton. Depicted as standing figure in barrister's robes, Thursby is flanked by Ionic pilasters with a baldicchino and drapery swags. Other Thursby monuments remember Downhall Thursby (d.1706), John Harvey Thursby I (d.1764), John Harvey Thursby II (d.1788).

== Gallery ==
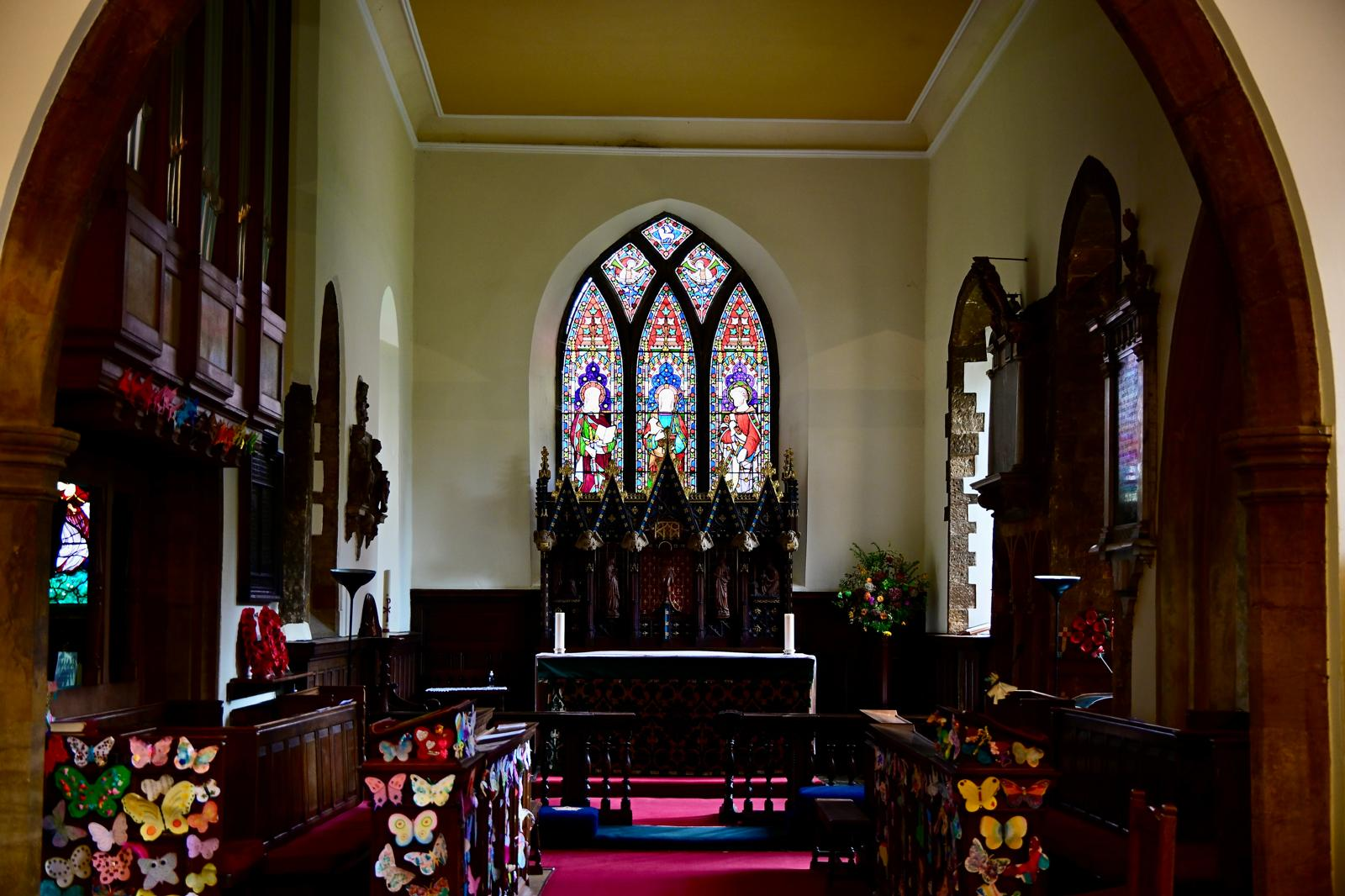
Chancel

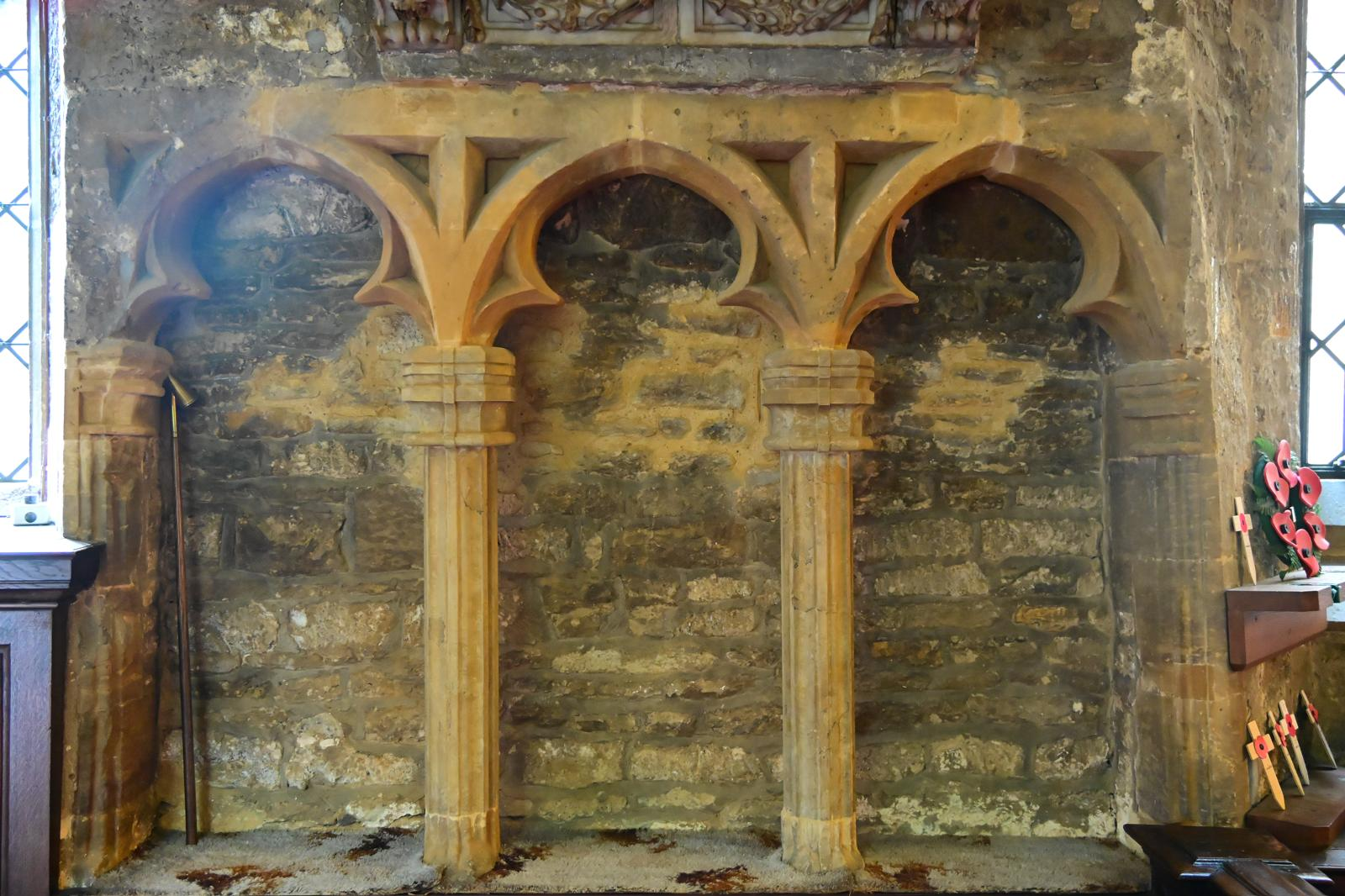
15th century sedilia

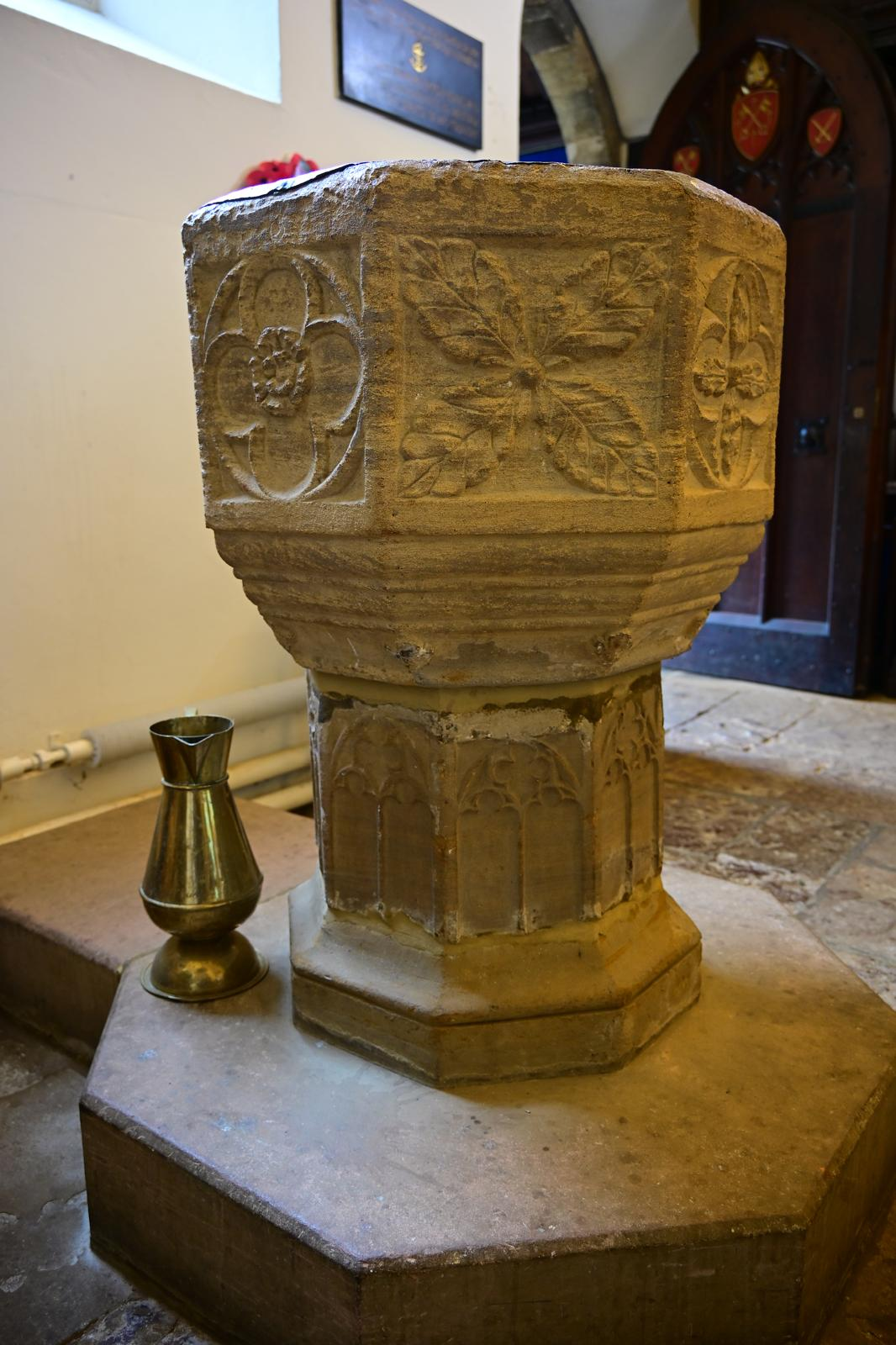
15th century baptismal font

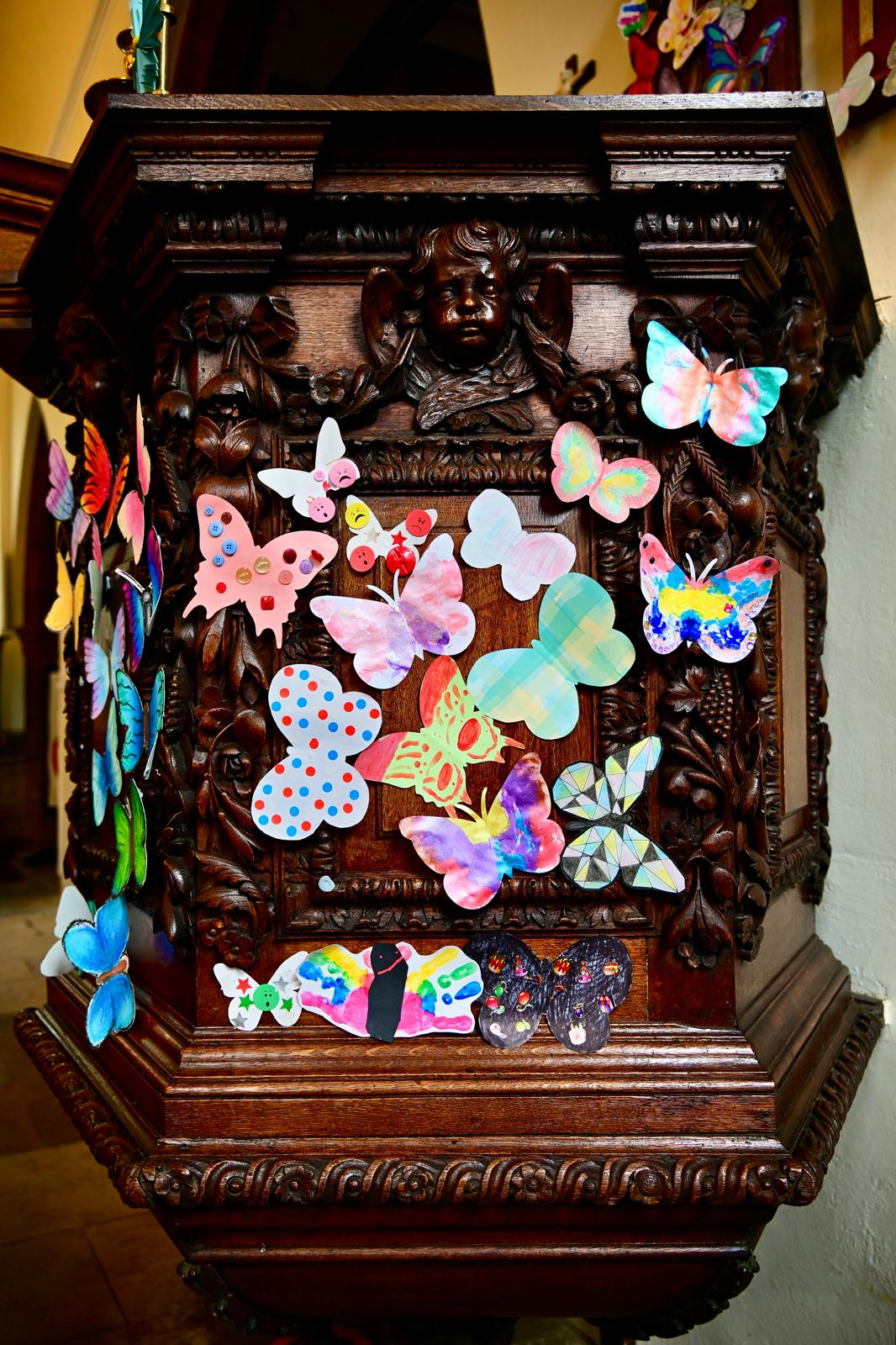
Pulpit, c.1700

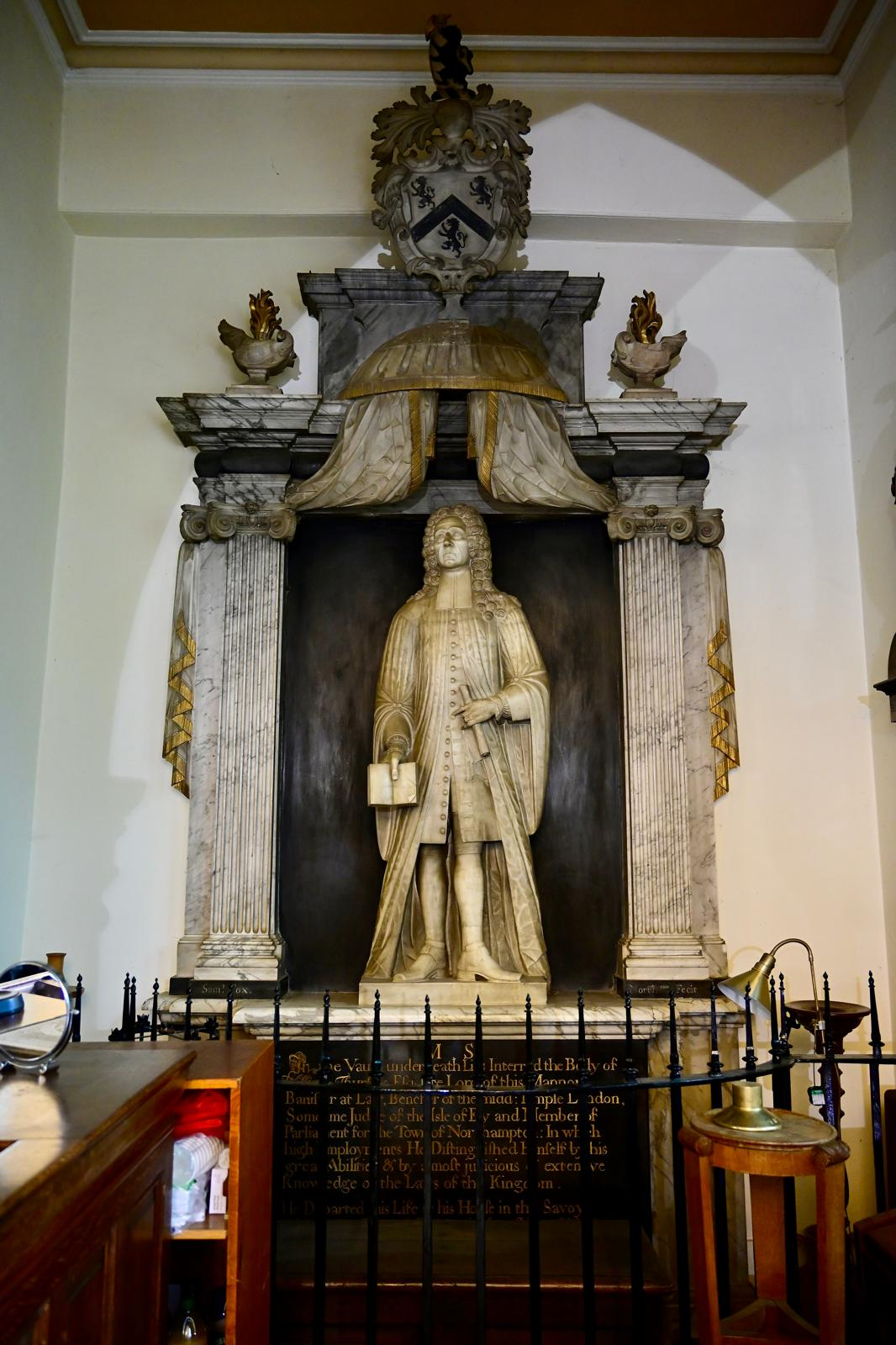
Memorial to William Thursby by Samuel Cox I, c.1730

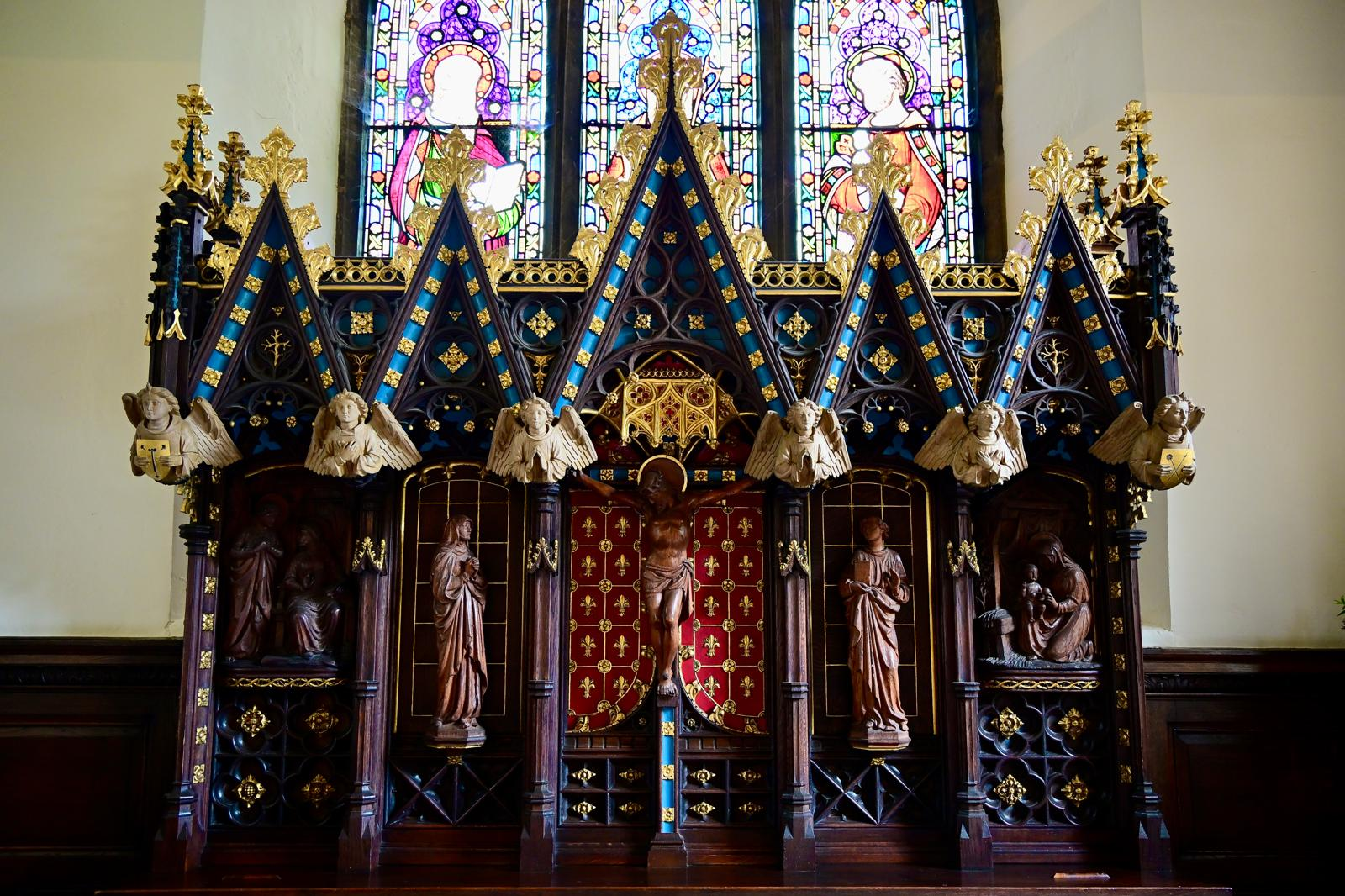
1923 reredos

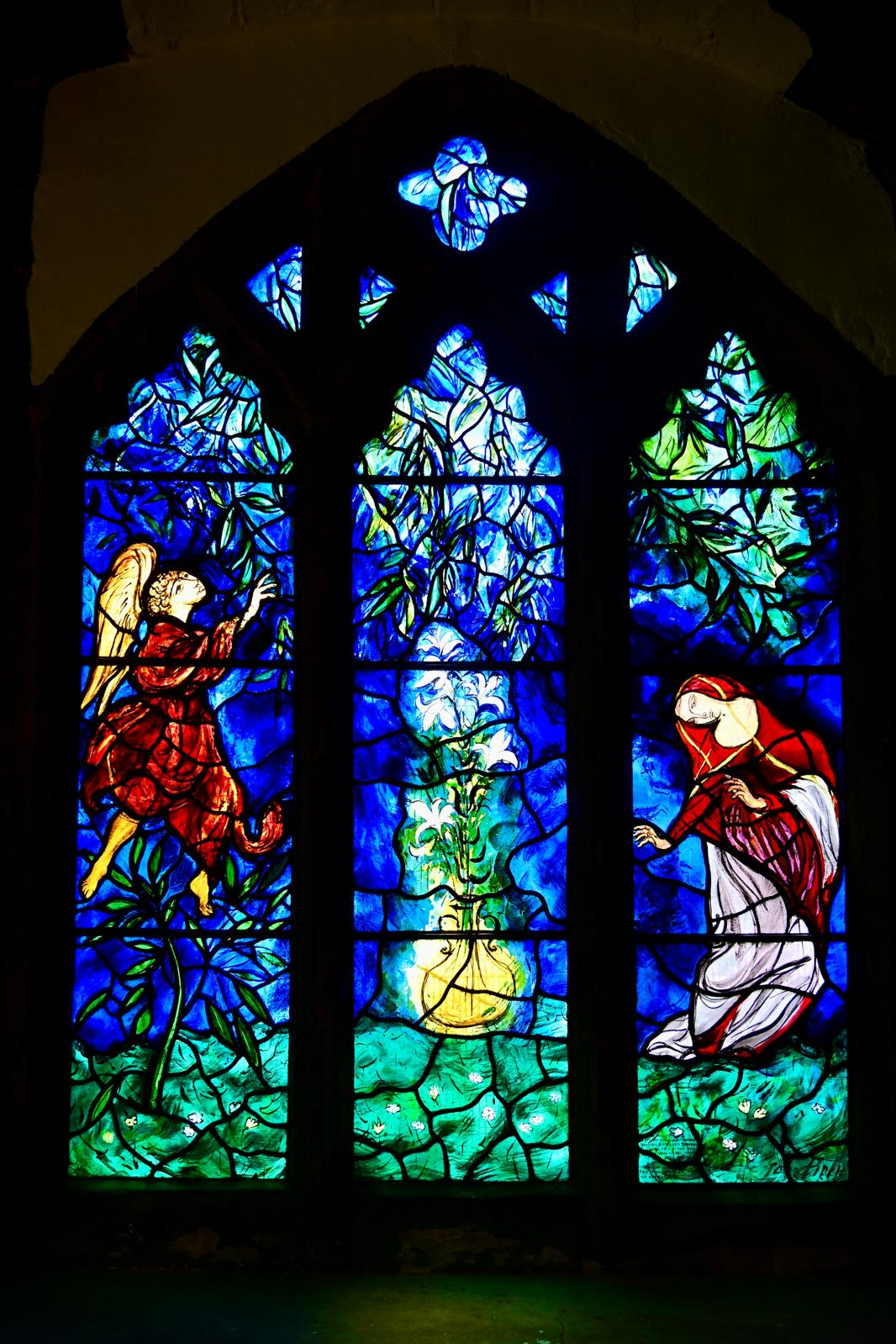
North chapel window by John Piper, 1982

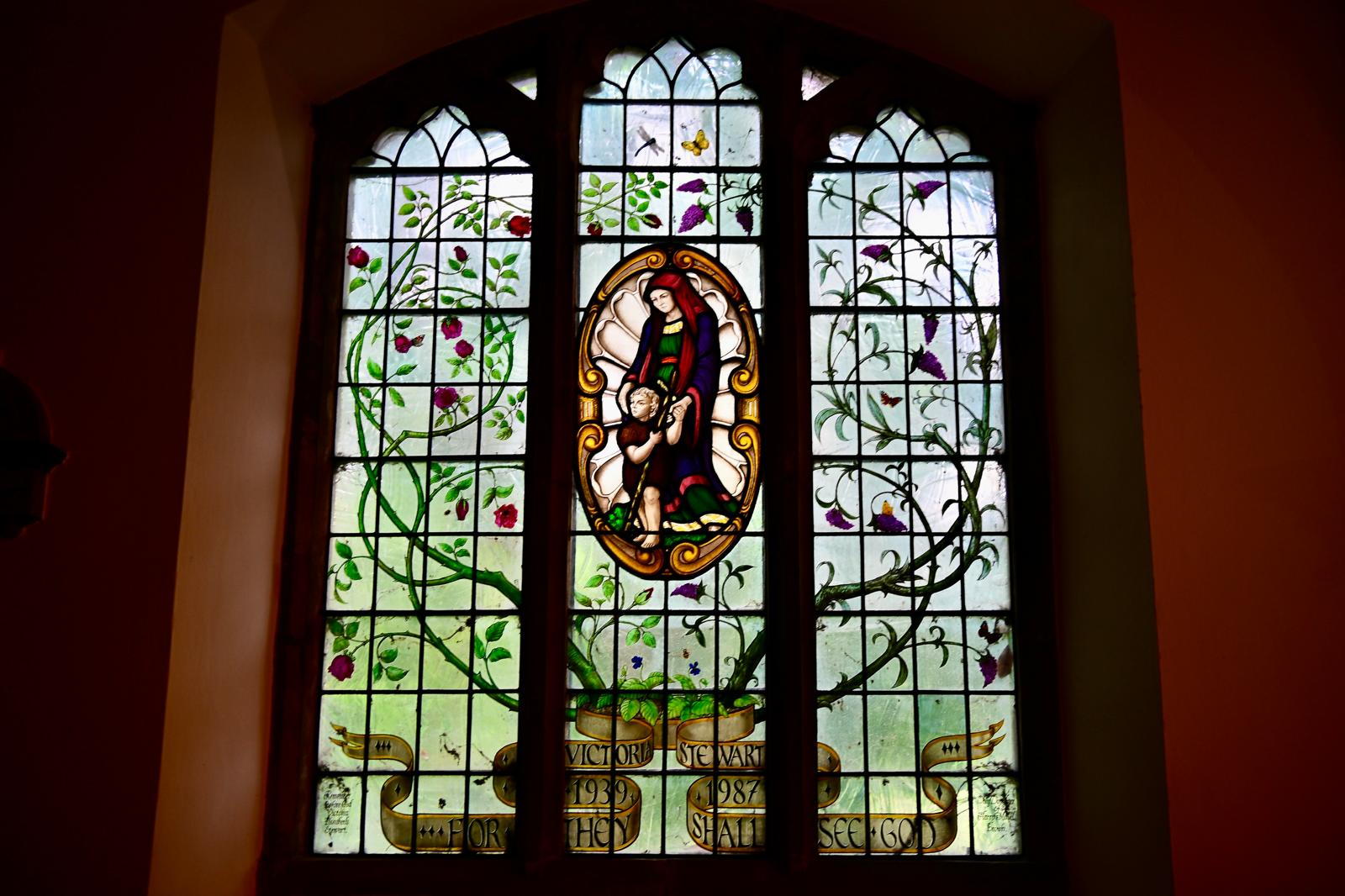
South chapel window by Monastery Glass, c.1987
