= List of acts of the Parliament of England from 1675 =

This is a list of acts of the Parliament of England for the year 1675.

For acts passed during the period 1707–1800, see the list of acts of the Parliament of Great Britain. See also the list of acts of the Parliament of Scotland, and the list of acts of the Parliament of Ireland.

For acts passed from 1801 onwards, see the list of acts of the Parliament of the United Kingdom. For acts of the devolved parliaments and assemblies in the United Kingdom, see the list of acts of the Scottish Parliament, the list of acts of the Northern Ireland Assembly, and the list of acts and measures of Senedd Cymru; see also the list of acts of the Parliament of Northern Ireland.

For medieval statutes, etc. that are not considered to be acts of Parliament, see the list of English statutes.

See also the List of ordinances and acts of the Parliament of England, 1642–1660 for ordinances and acts passed by the Long Parliament and other bodies without royal assent, and which were not considered to be valid legislation following the Restoration in 1660.

The number shown after each act's title is its chapter number. Acts are cited using this number, preceded by the years of the reign during which the relevant parliamentary session was held; thus the Union with Ireland Act 1800 is cited as "39 & 40 Geo. 3. c. 67", meaning the 67th act passed during the session that started in the 39th year of the reign of George III and which finished in the 40th year of that reign. The modern convention is to use Arabic numerals in citations (thus "41 Geo. 3" rather than "41 Geo. III"). Acts of the last session of the Parliament of Great Britain and the first session of the Parliament of the United Kingdom are both cited as "41 Geo. 3".

Acts passed by the Parliament of England did not have a short title; however, some of these acts have subsequently been given a short title by acts of the Parliament of the United Kingdom, such as the Short Titles Act 1896 (59 & 60 Vict. c. 14).

Acts passed by the Parliament of England were deemed to have come into effect on the first day of the session in which they were passed. Because of this, the years given in the list below may in fact be the year before a particular act was passed.

== 27 Cha. 2 ==
The fourteenth session of the 2nd Parliament of King Charles II (the 'Cavalier Parliament'), which met from 13 October 1675 until 22 November 1675.

The 11th session (October–November 1673) and 12th session (January–February 1674) did not pass any acts.

The 13th session (April–June 1675) did not pass any public acts. The private acts of the 13th session are listed with those of the 14th session.

This session was traditionally cited as 27 Car. 2, 27 Chas. 2 or 27 C. 2; it is listed in the "Chronological Table of the Statutes" as 27 Car. 2.

=== Public acts ===
Short title	Citation	Royal assent
Long title
Fire at Northampton (Property Disputes) Act 1675 (repealed)	27 Cha. 2. c. 1	22 November 1675
An Act for the better and more easy rebuilding the Towne of Northampton. (Repealed by Statute Law Revision Act 1948 (11 & 12 Geo. 6. c. 62))

=== Private acts ===
Short title	Citation	Royal assent
Long title
Grant of licence to Prince Rupert, Duke of Cumberland for thirty one years.	27 Cha. 2. c. 1 Pr.	9 June 1675
An Act for granting a License to his Highness Prince Rupert Duke of Cumberland, for One and Thirty Years.
Compton's Estate Act 1675	27 Cha. 2. c. 2 Pr.	9 June 1675
An Act to enable Sir Francis Compton to make Sale of the Manor of Hammerton, in the County of Huntingdon.
Russell's Naturalization Act 1675	27 Cha. 2. c. 3 Pr.	9 June 1675
An Act for the Naturalization of Theodore Russell and others.
Cotton's Estate Act 1675	27 Cha. 2. c. 4 Pr.	9 June 1675
An Act to enable Charles Cotton Esquire to sell Lands, for Payment of Debts, and raising Portions for Younger Children.
Lewis' Estate Act 1675	27 Cha. 2. c. 5 Pr.	9 June 1675
An Act for enabling Trustees to sell Lands, in the Counties of Glamorgan and Monmouth, for the Payment of the Debts of William Lewis Esquire deceased, and the Debts and Legacies of Edward Lewis Esquire deceased, his Son.
Earl of Warwick's Estate Act 1675	27 Cha. 2. c. 6 Pr.	22 November 1675
An Act for the better enabling of Mary Countess Dowager of Warwick to perform the last Will and Testament of her deceased Husband, Charles late Earl of Warwick.
Davies' Estate Act 1675	27 Cha. 2. c. 7 Pr.	22 November 1675
An Act for vesting the Lands of Alexander Davies Gentleman, deceased, in Trustees, for Payment of his Debts.

=== Sources ===
- Raithby, John, ed. (1963) [1819]. "27° Car. II.". Statutes of the Realm. Vol. 5: The Statutes of King Charles I and King Charles II (1625–1680). London: Dawsons. pp. 797–801 – via HathiTrust.
- Raithby, John, ed. (1819). Statutes of the Realm. Vol. 5: 1628-80 – via British History Online.
- Pickering, Danby, ed. (1763). "Anno vicesimo septimo Caroli II". The Statutes at Large. Vol. 8: From the Twelfth Year of King Charles II to the Last Year of King James II. Inclusive. Cambridge: Joseph Bentham. p. 404 – via Internet Archive.
- Journal of the House of Commons. Vol. 9. London: His Majesty's Stationery Office. 1803. pp. 314–382 – via Google Books.
- Chronological Table of and Index to the Statutes. Vol. 1: To the End of the Session 59 Vict. Sess. 2 (1895) (13th ed.). London: Her Majesty's Stationery Office. 1896. p. 73 – via Google Books.
- Chronological Table of the Statutes: Covering the Period from 1235 to the End of 1971. London: Her Majesty's Stationery Office. 1972. p. 70. ISBN 978-0-11-840096-1 – via Google Books.
- "Chronological Tables of the Private and Personal Acts: Part 3 (1660–1680)". legislation.gov.uk. The National Archives.

== See also ==
- List of acts of the Parliament of England
