= Thomas Octavius Prichard =

British psychiatrist (1808–1847)

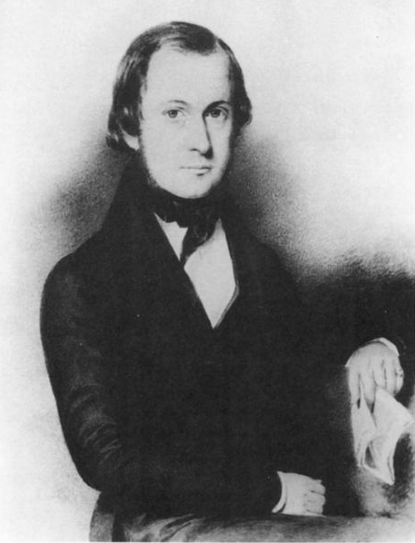
- Born: 1808
- Died: 1847 (aged 38–39)

Thomas Octavius Prichard (1808–1847) was an English psychiatrist, one of the earliest advocates of "moral management", the humane treatment of the mentally ill.

Having served as superintendent for two years at Glasgow Royal Lunatic Asylum, Prichard was appointed founding superintendent of the Northamptonshire County General Lunatic Asylum in 1838. Funded by public subscription, it was intended for "private and pauper lunatics". He built the number of patients up from 70 to 260 by 1844, claiming never to have to put patients under physical restraint. He saw non-restraint as part of "a system of kind and preventative treatment, in which all excitement is as much as possible avoided, and no care omitted": it is not clear whether he was influenced by the earlier work of Robert Gardiner Hill. When the poet John Clare entered the asylum in 1841, Prichard encouraged him to continue his writing.

Prichard resigned from the Northampton asylum in 1845 following allegations of professional misconduct. He opened a private asylum at Abington Manor near Northampton. Prichard died in 1847. The asylum was taken over by his cousin, Thomas Prichard (d.1878) who also married his widow (d.1852). She had been matron of the Northampton asylum and had five children from her first marriage.
