= Abington Park =

Park in the United Kingdom

- Edwardian postcard of Abington Manor with the church of St Peter and St Paul on the right

- Northamptonshire
- Established: 1897
- Location: Abington, Northampton
- Coordinates: 52°14′51″N 0°51′52″W
- Website: www.northampton.gov.uk/museums

Abington Park, in the Abington district of Northampton, Northamptonshire, England, has lakes, aviaries, and a museum, as well as trees and grassy open spaces.

== Origins ==
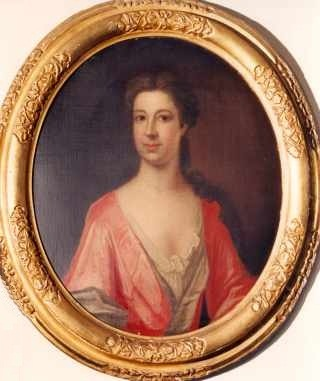
Elizabeth Bernard, granddaughter of William Shakespeare, lived in the Manor House in the mid-seventeenth century

The park contains the ruins of the former village of Abington, the site of a medieval manor house with a mill attached, mentioned in the Domesday Book in 1086. The Abington gallows used for the five hangings in 1612 following the Northamptonshire witch trials, amongst the first in England to use trial by ducking stool, are believed to have been situated at the crossroads in Abington Park. The village was enclosed and depopulated when the manor was enlarged and parklands created by the Thursby family in the late 17th century.

== Abington Park Manor House ==
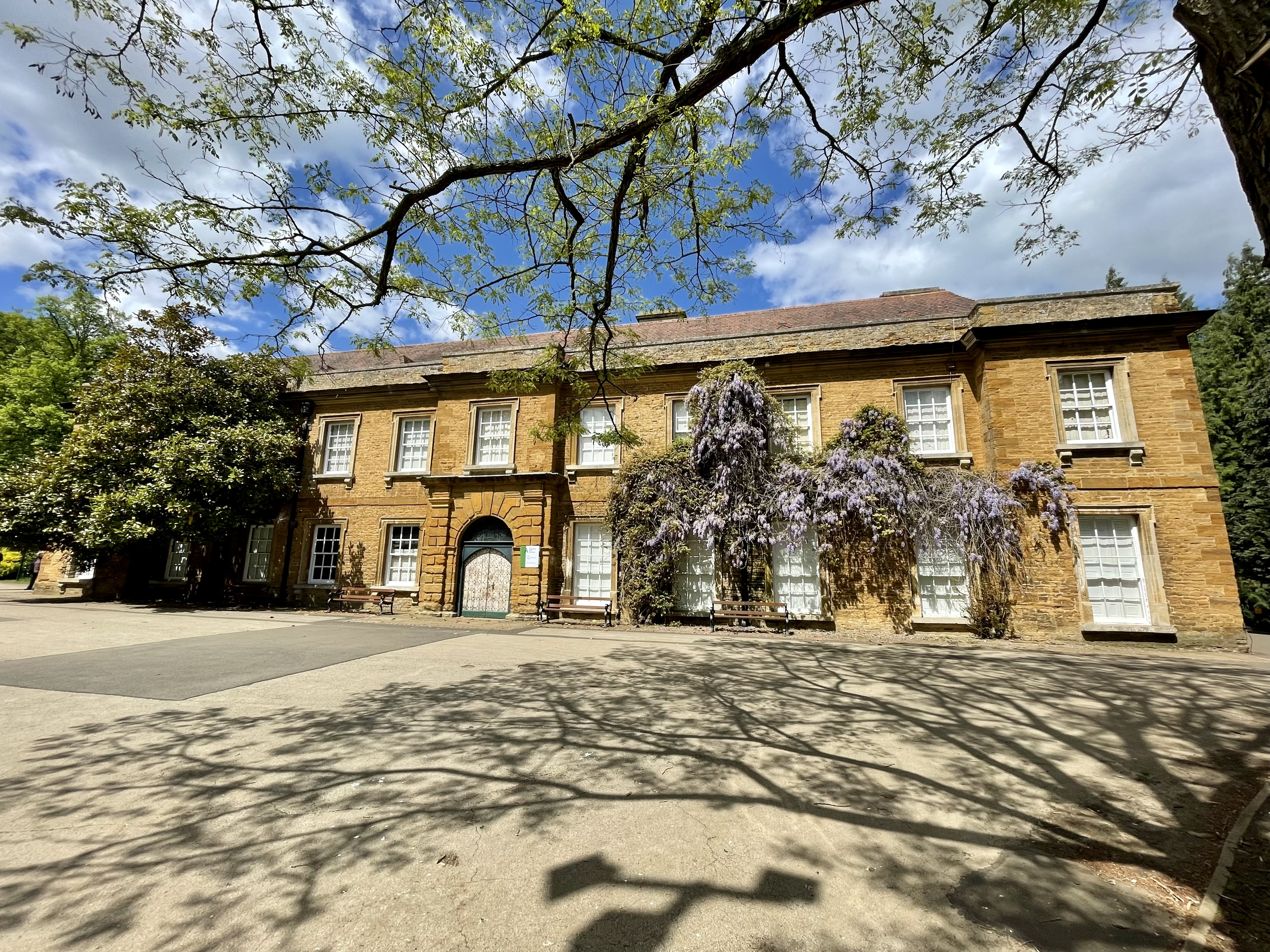
Abington Park Museum in May 2023

The museum was originally a manor house built at the turn of the 16th century. The Great Hall, now called the Oak Room because of its oak panelling, dates back to 1500. It was once home to William Shakespeare's granddaughter, Elizabeth Bernard née Elizabeth Hall, who was buried in 1670 in the adjacent late 12th-century church of St Peter and St Paul. Her second marriage was to Sir John Bernard or Barnard, the MP for Huntingdon from 1660, who successively enlarged the house in the 1660s. It passed to the Thursby family in 1669 and was further enlarged and remodelled in the classical Georgian style between 1738 and 1743 by William Thursby. While owned by the Thursbys, the actor David Garrick planted a mulberry tree in the grounds in 1778, in recognition of his friendship with Anne Thursby. In 1821, during repairs to the church, all but the main tower of the church was blown down in a storm; the Thursbys rebuilt the main body of the church, which retains few of its original features.

In 1841 the manor was sold and its contents auctioned off. It was converted into a private lunatic asylum, called Abington Abbey Retreat, in 1845. The first director was Thomas Octavius Prichard, who was succeeded in 1847 by his cousin Thomas Prichard. The asylum was closed in 1892, when the Manor House and grounds were donated to Northampton Council. In 1994 the house was reopened as a museum after a complete restoration. The museum features displays about the social history of Northamptonshire (including a costume collection) and its military history (including artefacts from the Northamptonshire Regiment). The Museum of Leathercraft was also based in the house until 2016, when it moved to premises in the Grosvenor Shopping Centre in the centre of Northampton.

== The Park ==
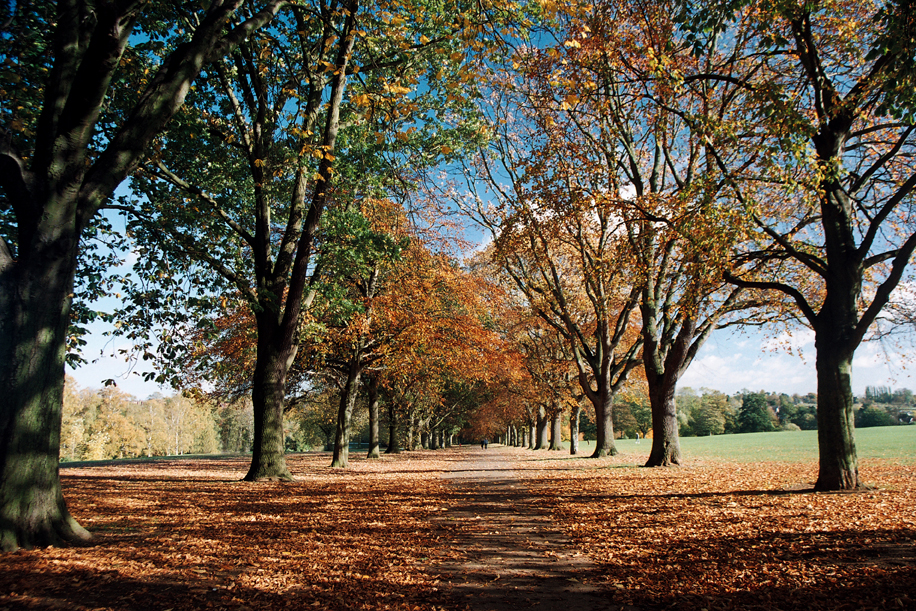
Abington Park

Abington Park has a bandstand which is suitable for hosting a selection of brass band, concert band, folk or jazz music. It was the venue for the annual 'Folk in the Park' festival until it moved to Delapré Park. The park also contains two lakes and a model boating lake, connected by a stream. The largest of the lakes was remodelled in the 1920s. There is also a play park, a cafe, tennis courts, outdoor table tennis, and a rose garden, as well as the church of St Peter and St Paul.
