= Hazelrigg House =

House in Northampton, England

Coordinates: 52°14′12.15″N 0°54′8.92″W

Hazelrigg House is a historic Grade II* listed sandstone house of 2½ storeys in Northampton, in the ceremonial county of Northamptonshire, England.

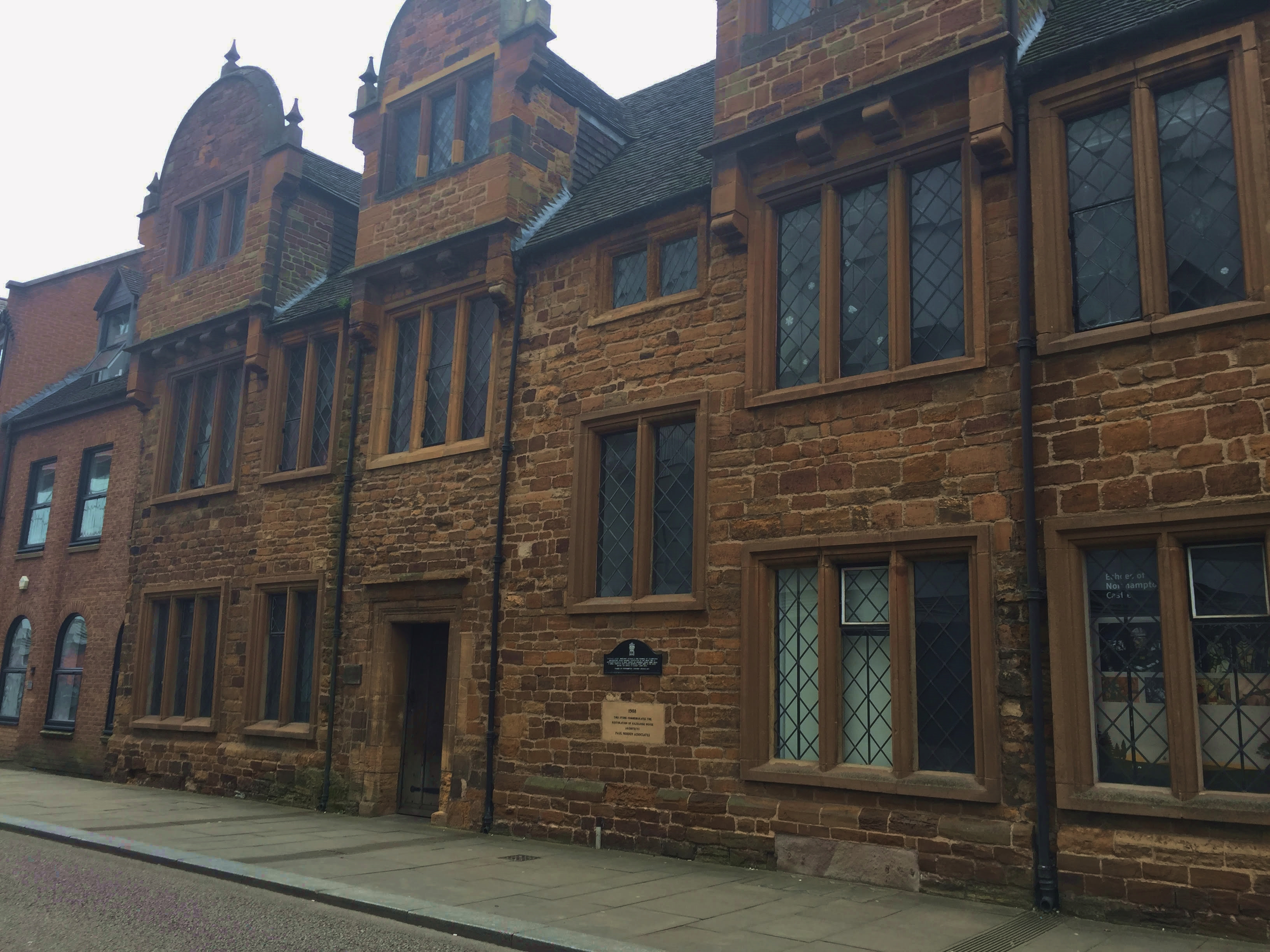
Hazelrigg House

It is not known exactly when the building was built, but an examination of the building's roof trusses suggests that the property dates from the early 16th century and it is one of the few houses to escape the Great Fire of Northampton in September 1675, when only a part of it was destroyed. The building's name derives from the Hazelrigg family who owned it for many years. It has also been known as Cromwell House and Hazelrigg Manor. The Cromwell reference derives from a local tradition that Oliver Cromwell spent the night at Hazelrigg House on his way to the Battle of Naseby in 1645. Unfortunately this local reference isn't supported by any documentary evidence.

The property has a tiled roof and has three gables; the house as built was originally wider, with five rather the current three gables which were added in the 17th century, probably at the same time that the front of the house was remodelled; an extension was also added at the rear. This rebuilding may have been made in addition to the repairs after its partial damage caused by the Great Fire.

The property was divided into three separate houses sometime in the 19th century, and subsequently (sometime before 1886) reduced in width from 5 gables to the present 3 gables when part was demolished.

The house stayed in the Hazelrigg family until 1831. After this, the new owner let the property. In 1913 the Northamptonshire Ladies Club purchased the building to use as its meeting place, sharing it with the local Women's Institute branch as well as the Northamptonshire Architectural & Archaeological Society. In the early 1960s it was acquired by the national architects practice of Marshman Warren Taylor who remained there until the late 1970s. After this the building sat empty for most of the 1980s, by which time it had been acquired by Northampton Borough Council. In 1989 it was refurbished by its tenant, another firm of architects. In 1994 English Heritage became the tenant, staying until 2004; after this the property was occupied by a succession of children's nurseries.; the property was occupied by a theatre company until 2021. After the theatre company left the building remained unoccupied until Feb 2024.

On the 19th Feb 2024, Square Feet Cowork, a local company offering coworking, meeting rooms and serviced office hire entered into a new 10 year lease with the landlord, West Northamptonshire Council. The new venue will open to the public in April 2024.

Pevsner describes the building thus: "Dates from 17th C. Altered later and reduced in size. Coursed rubble, three big dormers with semi-circular gables typical of the mid 17th C. Tall mullioned windows. Irregular fenestration. Doorway with flat classical surround. Staircase with twisted balusters. Probably later."
