= Abington, Northamptonshire =

Suburb in Northampton, England

Coordinates: 52.248°N 0.862°W

Abington
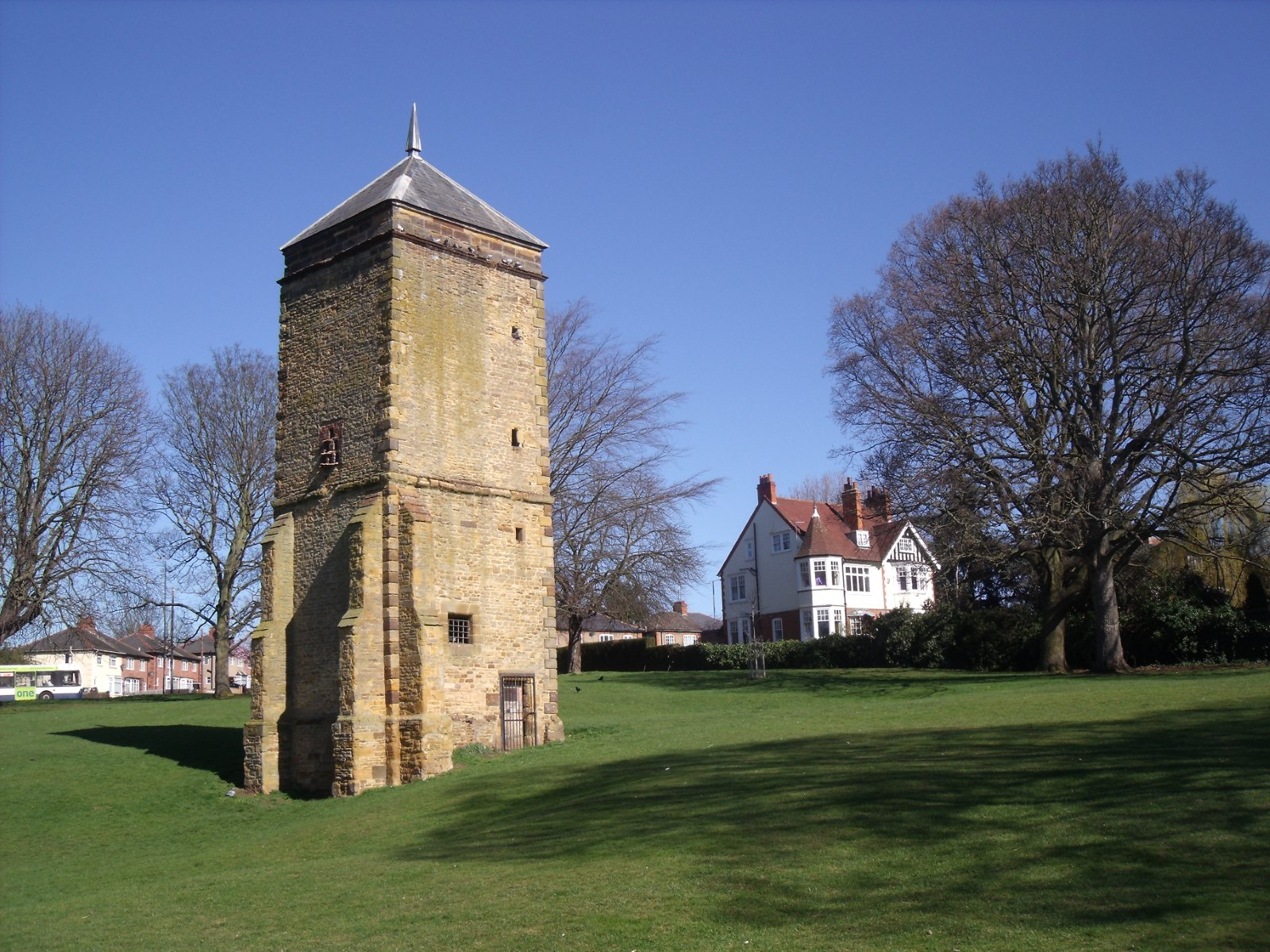
- 18th century pigeonry tower in Abington Park

- Location within Northamptonshire
- Population: 9,668 (Ward. 2011)
- OS grid reference: SP778617
  - London: 66 miles
- Civil parish: Northampton
- Unitary authority: West Northamptonshire
- Ceremonial county: Northamptonshire
- Region: East Midlands
- Country: England
- Sovereign state: United Kingdom
- Post town: NORTHAMPTON
- Postcode district: NN1
- Dialling code: 01604
- Police: Northamptonshire
- Fire: Northamptonshire
- Ambulance: East Midlands

Abington is a district of the town of Northampton, in the West Northamptonshire district, in the ceremonial county of Northamptonshire, England, situated about 2 miles (3.2 km) east of the town centre. The population of the ward of Northampton Borough Council at the 2011 census was 9,668.

The name 'Abington' means 'Farm/settlement connected with Abba'.

Originally a small village outside the borough boundary of Northampton, Abington is mentioned in The Domesday Book. In the 17th century the village was enclosed and depopulated. The outlines of the village's streets can still be seen as can the village's fishpond (although this is now a garden) in Abington Park. The park was given to the town by the Wantage family in the 19th century.

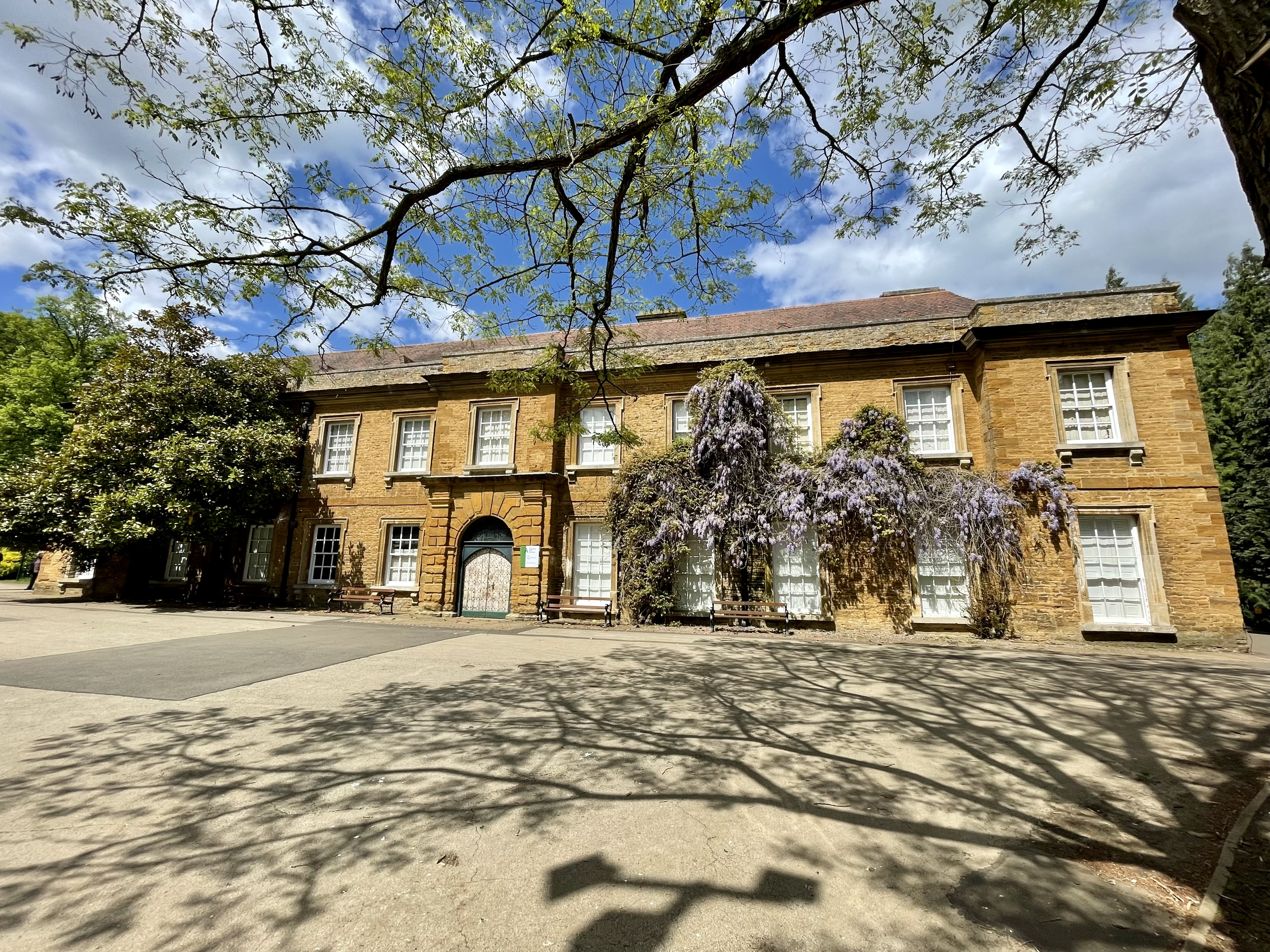
Abington Park Museum in May 2023

The area known as Abington became part of the borough of Northampton in the late 19th century as the town expanded. Its close location to Abington Park causes this to be a highly sought-after residential area. Abington has often been described as "the Greenwich Village of Northampton."

The Wellingborough Road (locally known as the "Welly Rd") passes through the centre of Abington containing many restaurants, pubs and supermarkets and is the heartbeat of the area. St Edmunds Hospital was once open on the Wellingborough Road before being closed in 1997 and demolished to make way for new development. Housing is mixed with former warehouses becoming converted flats, terraced housing and council housing.

Wantage Road in Abington is home to Northamptonshire County Cricket Club and was formerly the home of Northampton Town Football Club on Abington Avenue before the club moved to Sixfields in modern premises west of the town.

== Civil parish ==
On 1 April 1913 the parish was abolished and merged with Northampton. In 1911 the parish had a population of 2485.
