= List of monastic houses in Northamptonshire =

Locations of monastic houses in Northamptonshire
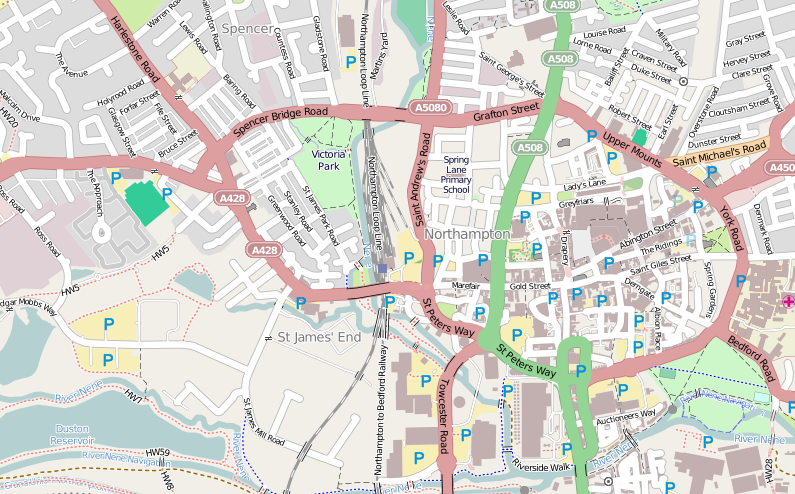
Locations of monastic houses in Northampton

The following is a list of the monastic houses in Northamptonshire, England.

Alien houses are included, as are smaller establishments such as cells and notable monastic granges (particularly those with resident monks), and also camerae of the military orders of monks (Knights Templar and Knights Hospitaller). Monastic hospitals are included where they had the status or function of an abbey, priory, or preceptor/commandery.

Abbreviations and key

Status of remains
Symbol	Status
None	Ruins
*	Current monastic function
^{+}	Current non-monastic ecclesiastic function (including remains incorporated into later structure)
^	Current non-ecclesiastic function (including remains incorporated into later structure) or redundant intact structure
^{$}	Remains limited to earthworks etc.
^{#}	No identifiable trace of the monastic foundation remains
^{~}	Exact site of monastic foundation unknown
^{≈}	Identification ambiguous or confused

Locations with names in italics indicate possible duplication (misidentification with another location) or non-existent foundations (either erroneous reference or proposed foundation never implemented) or ecclesiastical establishments with a monastic name but lacking actual monastic connection.

Trusteeship
EH	English Heritage
LT	Landmark Trust
NT	National Trust

Foundation	Image	Communities & provenance	Formal name or dedication & alternative names	References & location
Brackley Blackfriars		hospital of Ss James and John; Dominican Friars (1420) intended conversion of hospital never implemented		
Brixworth Abbey ^{+}		Saxon monastery Benedictine? monks founded after 675; daughter church of Medehamstede (Peterborough), Mercia (Cambridgeshire); probably became a minster; destroyed? 870 in raids by the Danes; parochial c.960-70; now parochial: All Saints' Church, Brixworth		52°20′02″N 0°54′16″W
Canons Ashby Priory ^{+}		Augustinian Canons Regular founded 1147-51 (during the reign of Stephen) by Stephen de Leye; dissolved 1536; became nunnery; granted to Sir Francis Bryan 1537/8; converted into secular residence; part of church now in parochial use	The Priory Church of the Blessed Virgin Mary, Ashby ____________________; Canon's Ashby Priory; Ashby Priory	52°09′00″N 1°09′24″W
Castor Priory		Saxon nuns founded before 664–5; destroyed by the Danes c.870 (or, less likely, 1010)	Dormundescastre Priory	
Catesby Priory		evidently initially Benedictine nuns founded c.1175 by Robert de Esseby (Ashby); order by papal bull c.1189; Cistercian nuns founded c.1175; Augustinian Canons Regular founded after 1175 (associated with the Cistercian nunnery); (given as Gilbertine in the Mappa Mundi); with regular priests or brethren (from date unknown to after 1316) dissolved 1536; granted to John Onley 1536/7; house built on site 16th century; demolished 1863	St Mary and St Edmund or St Mary, St Edmund and St Thomas the Martyr (?) ____________________; Katebi Priory; Katesbey Priory	52°13′49″N 1°14′24″W; 52°13′53″N 1°14′51″W
Chacombe Priory		Augustinian Canons Regular founded between 1216 and 1272 (during the reign of Henry II); dissolved 1536; granted to Michael Fox 1544/5; house named 'Chacombe Priory' built 17th century on the site	Chalcombe Priory	52°05′28″N 1°17′22″W
Daventry Priory		Cluniac monks (founded initially at Preston Capes c.1090); transferred here 1107–8; alien house: dependent on La Charite; allegedly seceded from Cluniac Order c.1231, although apparently reported directly to La Charite 1298, 1390 and 1405; became denizen: independent from 1405; dissolved 1525; granted to Christ Church, Oxford; Holy Cross church attached to the west range of the claustral buildings, demolished and replaced 19th century	St Augustine ____________________; Daventre Priory	52°15′31″N 1°09′32″W
Deene Priory		Benedictine monks priory cell, dependent on Westminster; founded before 1066; dissolved after 1086		52°31′03″N 0°36′05″W
Delapré Abbey		Cluniac nuns founded c.1145, built by Simon de St Liz (Senlis) II, Earl of Northampton; dissolved 15 December 1538; granted to John Merabe 1542/3	St Mary ____________________; Northampton, Delapre Abbey; de Pratis	52°13′28″N 0°53′22″W
Dingley Preceptory		Knights Hospitallers founded before 1154; merged with Battisford 1461; dissolved 1540; granted to Edward Griffith 1544		52°28′57″N 0°51′57″W
Everdon Priory ^{#}		Benedictine monks alien house: grange dependent on Bernay founded before c.1100; considered by some a parcel of Creeting St. Mary; dependent on Eton College before 1367; dissolved before c.1399; granted to Eton College 1440; remains recorded 1720; not locatable by 1970		52°12′42″N 1°07′34″W
Fineshade Priory		Augustinian Canons Regular founded before 1208 by Richard Engayne (Engain), Lord of Blatherwike; dissolved 1536; granted to John, Lord Russell 1541/2; Sir Robert Kirkham converted west range into a country residence, which was demolished along with the remains of the priory 1749; house subsequently built on site; demolished 1956	St Mary ____________________; Castle Hymel Priory	52°34′08″N 0°33′54″W
Fotheringhay Nunnery		Cluniac nuns founded c1141(?) transferred to Delapré c.1145; secular college founded on site 1411, with associated church c.1460; dissolved 1548; granted to James Crew	Fodringhey College	52°31′32″N 0°26′23″W
Grafton Regis Priory		Augustininan Canons Regular cell or hermitage; founded 1180–1205; amalgamated with the Abbey of St James's, Northampton before 1400 (end of 14th century)	St Mary and St Michael ____________________; Grafton Regis Hermitage	52°06′52″N 0°54′09″W
Guilsborough Preceptory		Knights Hospitaller camera/hospital founded before 1285; dissolved before 1338		
Kalendar Priory		Premonstratensian canons priory?/cell, dependent on Sulby; founded after 1155: land granted by William Buttevant; probably ceased to exist before 1291(?)	St John ____________________; Kayland Priory; Kaylend Priory	52°21′55″N 0°59′17″W
Luffield Priory, Syresham	Partly in Buckinghamshire. See entry under List of monastic houses in Buckinghamshire			
Northampton Abbey		Augustinian Canons Regular founded c.1145-50 by William Peverel II of Nottingham; dissolved August 1538; granted to Nicholas Giffard 1545/6; housing estate now occupies site	The Abbey Church of Saint James, known as Northampton Abbey in St James End, Northampton	52°14′26″N 0°55′30″W
Northampton Austin Friars		Augustinian Friars (under the Limit of Oxford) founded 1275-90 (or possibly not before 1323 by Sir John Longville, of Wolverton (Note: Northampton Austin Friars: Sir John Longville is said to have founded the house 1323, however deeds between 1275 and 1290 refer to an Austin friary in existence at that time)); dissolved 1538; granted to Robert Dighton 1540/1		52°14′04″N 0°53′53″W
Northampton Blackfriars ^{~}		Dominican Friars (under the Visitation of Oxford) founded before 1233; dissolved 1538; granted to William Ramesden 1544/5		52°14′12″N 0°54′01″W (probable)
Northampton Friars of the Sack		Friars of the Sack founded before 1271; abandoned (before(?)) 1303		52°14′08″N 0°53′23″W (probable)
Northampton Greyfriars, earlier site		Franciscan Friars (under the Custody of Oxford) founded 1226 by Sir Richard Gobion; transferred to new site (see immediately below) c.1235		
Northampton Greyfriars		Franciscan Friars (under the Custody of Oxford) transferred from earlier site (see immediately above) c.1235; built by 1258; dissolved 1538; granted to Richard Taverner 1544/5		52°14′22″N 0°53′42″W
Northampton — St Andrew's Priory		Cluniac monks alien house: dependent on La Charité founded 1093–1100; became denizen: independent from 1405; dissolved 1538; site built over 19th century	St Andrew	52°14′38″N 0°54′11″W
Northampton Whitefriars		Camelite Friars founded before 1265 (1271) by Simon Montford and Thomas Chitwood; dissolved 1538; granted to William Ramesden 1544/6		52°14′27″N 0°53′41″W
Northampton Nunnery		Franciscan nuns founded 1252; dissolved after 1272		
Oxney Priory	Historical county location. See entry under List of monastic houses in Cambridgeshire			
Peterborough Abbey	Historical county location. See entry under List of monastic houses in Cambridgeshire			
Pipewell Abbey		Cistercian monks daughter house of Newminster; founded 13 September 1143 (1141) by William de Boutwylein; dissolved 5 November 1538; granted to William, Marquess of Northampton 1547/8; ruinous by 1548; systematically demolished and used as building material; (not the modern 'Abbey church' to the north)	Pikewell Abbey	52°27′42″N 0°45′56″W
Preston Capes Priory		Cluniac monks alien house: dependent on La Charité; founded c.1090 by Hugh de Leicester; transferred to Daventry 1107–8		52°10′53″N 1°10′04″W
Rothwell Priory		Augustinian canonesses founded before 1262, probably by a member of the Clare family, purportedly by Richard de Clare, Earl of Gloucester; dissolved 1537–8; former farmhouse known as 'The Nunnery' possibly built on site	The Priory Church of Saint John the Baptist, Rothwell	52°25′28″N 0°48′21″W
Sewardsley Priory		Cistercian nuns founded between 1216 and 1272 (during the reign of Henry II) by Richard de Lestre; dependent on the Cluniacs at Delapré 1459/60 for maintenance (though no evidence that the community converted to the Cluniac order); dissolved 1538; granted to Richard Fermer 1550/1	Sewardesley Priory	52°09′03″N 0°57′13″W
Stamford — St Michael's Priory	Historical county location. See entry under List of monastic houses in Cambridgeshire			
Stamford — St Sepulchre Priory	Historical county location. See entry under List of monastic houses in Cambridgeshire			
Sulby Abbey		Premonstratensian Canons daughter house of Newsham; mistakenly asserted to have transferred from Welford (Note: Welford — Victoria County Histories, Northamptonshire, Vol II, p139: "Unfortunately the early records of Sulby are very meagre, and no chartulary or register is extant. We know that the abbey was originally founded in Welford parish, and subsequently moved to Sulby. The confirmation charter of Edward II., already referred to, describes the abbey as formerly of Welford, and now of Sulby" — this is a misinterpretation of the cited Pat. 9 Edw.II pt.2, m.2) founded 1155 by William de Wideville; dissolved 1538; granted to Sir Christopher Hatton 1567/8	Sulbey Abbey; Welford Abbey	52°24′53″N 1°02′04″W
Weedon Monastery		Benedictine? nuns founded c.680 by St Werburgh, possibly on the site of an Anglo-Saxon royal palace; destroyed in raids by the Danes 870		52°13′35″N 1°04′24″W
Weedon Beck Priory		Benedictine monks alien house: dependent on Bec-Hellouin and St Lambert de Mallassis; founded before 1086 (after 1126); dissolved after 1329(?); granted to Eton College 1462	Weedon Bec Priory	52°13′32″N 1°04′45″W
Weedon Pinkney Priory		Benedictine monks founded before 1126 (in the tenure of Robert, Bishop of Lincoln): endowments granted by Gilo de Pinkney and other members of his family; dependent on St Lucien, Beauvais; granted to Biddlesden 1392; manor granted to All Souls College, Oxford 1440	Weedon Lois Priory	52°07′03″N 1°07′18″W
Wermundsey Monastery ^{~}		unidentified, dependent on Peterborough, possibly located in Northamptonshire founded after 675 during the tenure of Abbot Cuthbald; destroyed in raids by the Danes 870		
Wittering Priory	Historical county location. See entry under List of monastic houses in Cambridgeshire			
Wothorpe Priory ^{#}		possibly intended Augustinian canonesses — Arroasian c.1160(?); Benedictine nuns founded 12th century (purportedly during the reign of Henry I); ruinous 1292; merged with Stamford 1354; granted to Richard Cecil 1540/1	St Mary ____________________; Wyrthorp Priory	52°38′09″N 0°29′12″W

== See also ==
- List of monastic houses in England
