= List of monastic houses in Buckinghamshire =

Locations of monastic houses in Buckinghamshire

The following is a list of the monastic houses in Buckinghamshire, England.

Alien houses are included, as are smaller establishments such as cells and notable monastic granges (particularly those with resident monks), and also camerae of the military orders of monks (Knights Templar and Knights Hospitaller). Monastic hospitals are included where they had the status or function of an abbey, priory, or preceptor/commandery.

Abbreviations and key

Status of remains
Symbol	Status
None	Ruins
*	Current monastic function
^{+}	Current non-monastic ecclesiastic function (including remains incorporated into later structure)
^	Current non-ecclesiastic function (including remains incorporated into later structure) or redundant intact structure
^{$}	Remains limited to earthworks etc.
^{#}	No identifiable trace of the monastic foundation remains
^{~}	Exact site of monastic foundation unknown
^{≈}	Identification ambiguous or confused

Locations with names in italics indicate possible duplication (misidentification with another location) or non-existent foundations (either erroneous reference or proposed foundation never implemented) or ecclesiastical establishments with a monastic name but lacking actual monastic connection.

Trusteeship
EH	English Heritage
LT	Landmark Trust
NT	National Trust

Foundation	Image	Communities & provenance	Formal name or dedication & alternative names	References & location
Aylesbury Greyfriars^{#}		Franciscan Friars Minor, Conventual (under the Custody of Oxford) founded 1387 by James Butler, Earl of Ormond; dissolved 1 October 1538		51°48′54″N 0°48′47″W
Aylesbury Monastery^{#}		possible nuns order and period unknown said to have been a nunnery or Trinitarian house — probably only a holding		51°48′35″N 0°48′43″W (possible)
Biddlesden Abbey^{#}		Cistercian monks — from Garendon, Leicestershire founded 10 July 1147 by Ernald de Bosco, seneschal of the Earl of Leicester; dissolved 29 September 1538; granted to Thomas Wriothesley 1540/1; remains demolished c.1727; site now occupied by private house named 'Biddlesden Park'	Saint Mary ____________________; Biddlesdon Abbey; Bittlesden Abbey	52°02′52″N 1°04′43″W
Bradwell Priory		Benedictine monks cell, dependent on Luffield; founded before 1136-44 (before/c.1155) by Meinfelin, Lord of Wolverton; dissolved 1524-5 (or 1526) by Cardinal Thomas Wolsey for Christ Church, Oxford; granted to Arthur Longfield 1542/3; now in private ownership; currently an urban studies centre	Saint Mary ____________________; Bradewell Priory	52°02′54″N 0°47′42″W
Bulstrode Preceptory ^{$}		Knights Templar founded before 1276; dissolved 1308–1312; land passed to and leased on behalf of the Knights Hospitaller, though they had no commandery here; site identified through earthworks		51°35′06″N 0°35′29″W
Burnham Abbey *		Augustinian canonesses founded 1265/66 by Richard, King of the Romans; dissolved 19 September 1539; granted to William Tyldesly 1544/5; Anglican Augustinian Society of the Precious Blood transferred from Birmingham 1916; extant	Saint Mary	51°30′56″N 0°39′37″W
Chetwode Priory ^{+}		Augustinian Canons Regular founded 1244 or 1245 by Ralph de Norwich; dissolved, being reduced to the status of a cell, annexed to Notley 1460–1; dissolved 1535; priory church became parochial c.1480 as the Parish Church of St Mary and St Nicholas	Saint Mary and Saint Nicholas ____________________; Chetwode Cell	51°57′47″N 1°04′10″W
Crawley Monastery		founded before 1042; (ref. as monasterium 1086)	St Firmin ____________________; North Crawley Monastery	52°05′12″N 0°39′31″W
Gare Nunnery		Benedictine nuns founded 1163 in Stoke Goldington by Robert de Salcey, Peter de Goldington and Richard de Besseville; granted to Delapré, Northamptonshire, late 12th/early 13th centuries; apparently reduced to status of a grange by 1438; subsequently recorded as destroyed	Gore Nunnery; Gorefields Nunnery; Prioratus Gore, Sanctae Mariae Magdalenae, Moniales Nigrae	
Hogshaw Nunnery ^{#}		St John of Jerusalem nuns cell foundation unknown transferred to Sisters of St John Priory, Buckland, Somerset c.1180; site occupied by Knights Hospitaller commandery (see immediately below)		51°53′45″N 0°55′44″W
Hogshaw Commandery ^{#}		Knights Hospitaller founded c.1180 on site of earlier nunnery (see immediately above), granted by William Peverel; dissolved 1470 becoming prior's possession; granted to Matilda Lane c.1543; church in use until 1650; ruined by 1700		51°53′45″N 0°55′44″W
Lavendon Abbey ^{$}		Premonstratensian Canons founded c.1154/5-1158 by John de Bidun, sheriff of Buckinghamshire; dissolved 1536; granted to Sir Edmund Peckham 1543; site now occupied by house named 'Lavendon Grange' (once the home of relatives of Sir Isaac Newton)	The Abbey Church of Saint John the Baptist, Lavendon ____________________; Lavinden Abbey	52°10′21″N 0°40′51″W
Little Marlow Priory		Benedictine nuns founded c.1195 or before 1218 (or 1244 by Jeffrey, Lord Spensar); dissolved in, or before 1536; granted to John Tiltey and E. Restwold 1540	Saint Mary ____________________; Little Merlow Priory; Minchin Marlow Priory	51°34′53″N 0°43′05″W
Luffield Priory		Benedictine monks founded after 1118 (c.1123 or 1124, or 1133) by Robert II le Bossu, Earl of Leicester; suppression authorised by the Pope 1494; dissolution stayed until 1504, after the death of the serving prior	The Blessed Virgin Mary	52°04′16″N 1°01′34″W
Medmenham Abbey		Cistercian monks — from Woburn, Bedfordshire founded 1201/4, or in 1202 by Hugh de Bolbec; house built 1213; dissolved before 8 July 1536 (delayed from 1524); granted to Robert Mone and others 1547; converted into a manor house	The Abbey Church of the Blessed Virgin Mary, Medmenham ____________________; Mendham Abbey	51°32′52″N 0°50′17″W
Missenden Abbey ^		Augustinian/Arroasian Canons alien house: daughter house of St Mary de Bosco, or de Nemore, Ruisseauville, France; founded 1133 by William de Missenden; the house acknowledged royal supremacy 1536; dissolved 1538; granted to the Duke of Northumberland; now a residential college rarely open to general public	The Abbey Church of Saint Mary the Virgin, Great Missenden ____________________; Great Missenden Abbey	51°42′02″N 0°42′10″W
Newton Longville Priory		Cluniac monks alien house: daughter house of Longville Ste Foi Abbey founded c.1150 or before 1102 by Walter Giffard, Earl of Buckingham; dissolved 1414; granted to New College, Oxford 1441; Manor House purportedly built on site 1550; St Faith's Church incorporates 12th-century church remains, possibly originally part of the priory church and may have been the conventual church of the priory	St Faith ____________________; Newington-Longaville Priory; Newton-Longville Cell	51°58′28″N 0°46′03″W
Notley Abbey ^		Augustinian Canons Regular founded before 1162 by Walter Giffard, Earl of Buckingham, and Lady Ermgard; dissolved 9 December 1538; granted to Sir William Paget 1547; site now occupied by a private house without public access	The Abbey Church of the Blessed Virgin and Saint John the Baptist, Notley ____________________ abbey de parco Crendon; Crendon Parc Abbey abbey de parco super Thamam; Nuctele Abbey; Noctele Abbey; Nuttley Abbey; Nutley Abbey	51°46′37″N 0°57′51″W
Ravenstone Priory		Augustinian Canons Regular founded 1255 by Peter de Chaseport (Chaceport), Keeper of the Royal Wardrobe; dissolved 1525 (or 1544); granted to Sir Francis Byran 1548; site now occupied by 19th century 'Abbey Farm'	The Priory Church of St Mary ____________________; Ravinston Priory	52°09′01″N 0°45′32″W
Risborough Priory (?)		Benedictine monks — doubtful establishment; reputedly pre-Conquest cell of Canterbury Cathedral	Monks Risborough Priory	51°43′57″N 0°49′30″W
Snelshall Priory ^{$}		Premonstratensian Canons cell, dependent on Lavendon; founded before 1166, granted to Lavendon by Sybil de Aungervill (Dangerville); abandoned after 1203-4; Benedictine monks founded 1203/4-1219 by Ralph Mortel (grandson of Sybil de Aungervill); dissolved 1535; granted to Francis Piggot 1538; site currently comprises earthworks	St Leonard ____________________; Snellshall Priory	52°00′10″N 0°48′46″W
Tickford Priory		Benedictine-Cluniac monks alien house: cell of Marmoutier founded 1140 or c.1100 by Fulk Paynell; dissolved 1524; sold to Henry Atkins, MD by James I	Blessed Virgin Mary ____________________; Newport Pagnel Priory; Tyxford Priory	52°05′10″N 0°42′54″W
Widmere Commandery		Knights Hospitaller founded before 1248; dissolved before 1338	Widmere Camera; Widmere Preceptory	51°35′43″N 0°48′03″W
Wing Priory ^{#}		Saxon monastery 7th century Benedictine monks alien house: cell, dependent on St Nicholas, Angers founded before 1086; granted by Empress Matilda to Angers; land and later, chapel, granted to Angers by Bodin de Ver; in ownership of the Crown 1342-1361 and 1393–1423; dissolved 1416; granted to St Mary de Pré, Hertfordshire by St Albans, Hertfordshire; granted to Sir Robert Dormer by King Henry VIII	Wenge Priory	51°53′21″N 0°43′14″W

The following location in Buckinghamshire lacks known monastic connection:

- Wycombe Abbey: Independent girls' school

== See also ==
- List of monastic houses in England
