= Sixfields =

Area of Northampton, England

Coordinates: 52.236°N 0.931°W

Sixfields: Sixfields
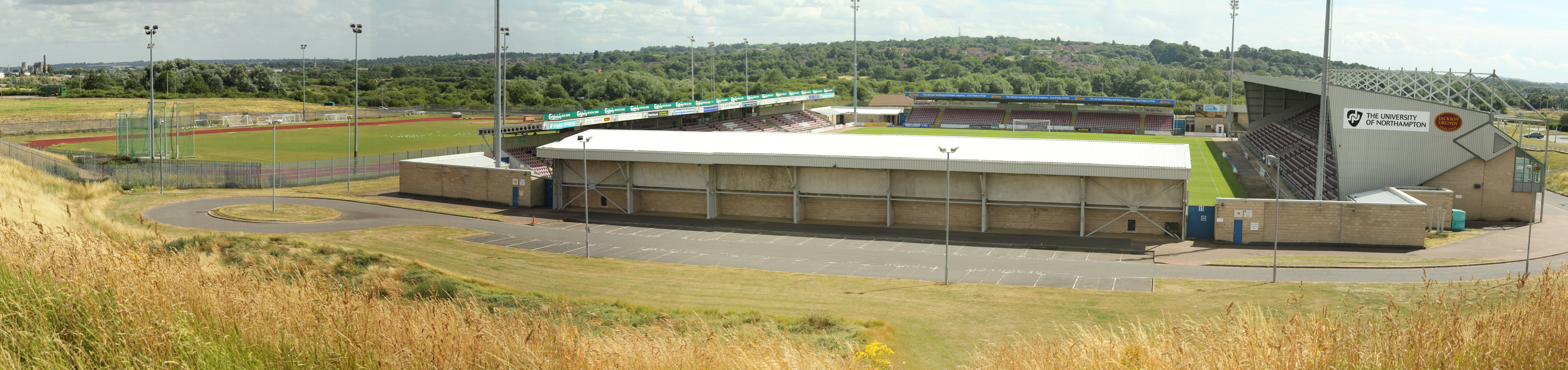
- Panoramic view of Sixfields Stadium looking south towards Hunsbury Hill. In the distance on the left side is the Carlsberg Brewery

- Location within Northamptonshire
- Population: 12,000 Est for Sixfield NCC Division
  - London: 60 mi (97 km)
- Civil parish: Northampton
- Unitary authority: West Northamptonshire
- Ceremonial county: Northamptonshire
- Region: East Midlands
- Country: England
- Sovereign state: United Kingdom
- Post town: Northampton
- Postcode district: NN
- Dialling code: 01604
- UK Parliament: Northampton South; and South Northamptonshire

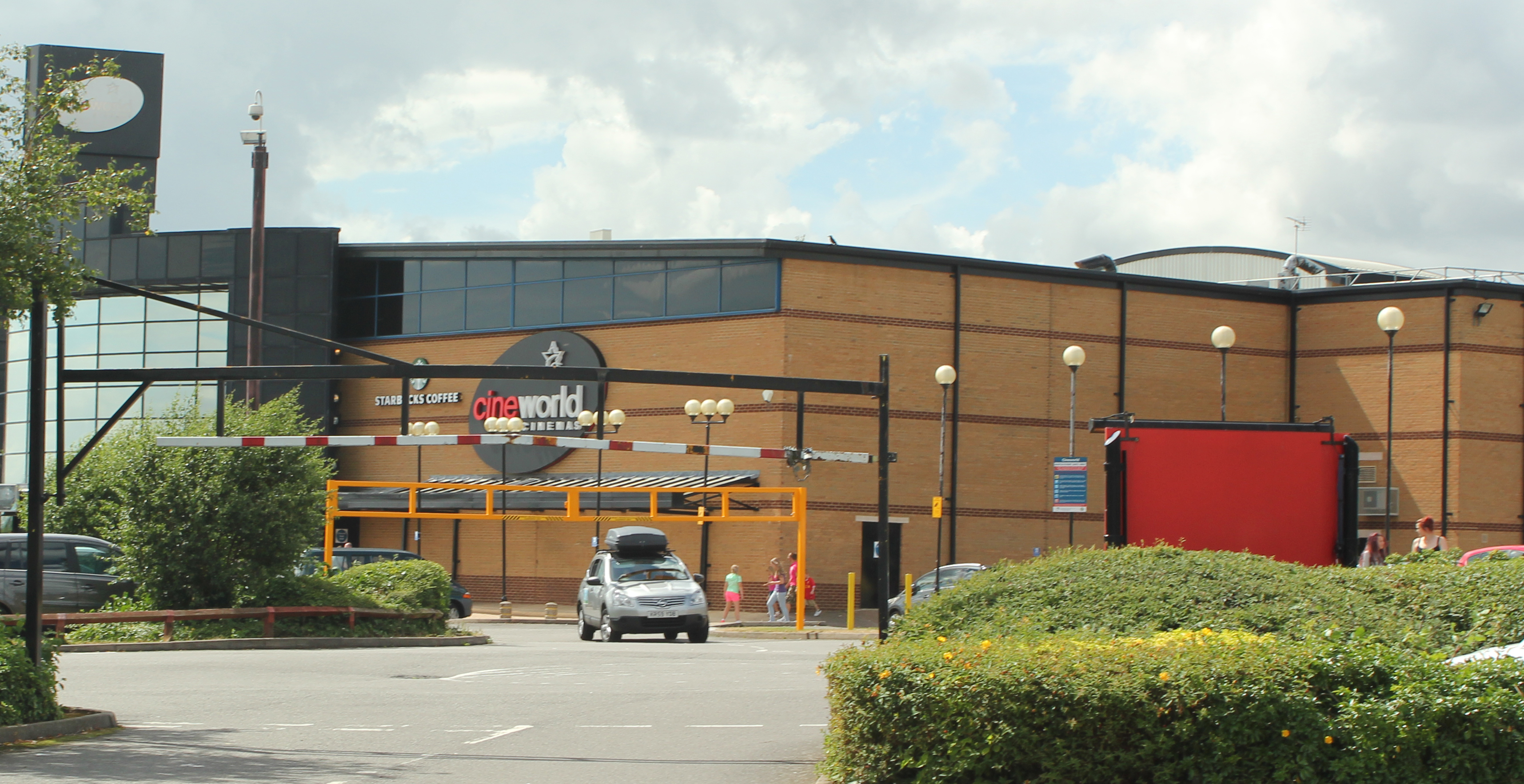
Multi screen cinema, Cineworld, at Sixfields

Sixfields is an area of Northampton, in the West Northamptonshire district, in Northamptonshire, England, about 1 mile (1.6 km) west of the town centre along the A4500 St James Road and Weedon Road towards M1 junction 16 about 2 miles (3.2 km) further west. It is close to the Duston, Upton and St James areas of the town. Located next to The River Nene and The Grand Union Canal (Northampton Arm), Sixfields is often called "The Starcity of Northamptonshire" .

== Northamptonshire County Council Division ==
Sixfields is also the name of a division of Northamptonshire County Council since the 2013 county council elections when it was held by the Liberal Democrat party. The division covers the Northampton town areas of Briar Hill, Camp Hill, part of West Hunsbury, Hunsbury Hill, Swan Valley, Hunsbury Meadows, Upton and St James. The division includes the Sixfields Stadium used by Northampton Town Football Club (known as "The Cobblers") as well as the Northampton Saints Rugby Football Club stadium both of which are due to expand in 2013. The Northampton Lift Tower is also located there. The River Nene flows in the valley between the north and south parts of the division. Significant flooding occurred in the St James area in 1998.

== Background ==
Part of the area was a landfill site for domestic waste originally. It was redeveloped into a leisure area to accommodate the Sixfields Stadium and an athletics running track. A domestic and trade waste recycling centre run by Northamptonshire County Council occupies part of the site, but will be relocated soon.

== Walter Tull memorial ==
Near the Cobblers stadium is a memorial to Walter Tull who played for Northampton Town. Tull became the first black/mixed race combat officer in the British Army during the first world war and was killed in action during 1918. The road past the stadium is named Walter Tull Way often showing signs of subsidence due to the previous use as a waste site.
