= St James End, Northampton =

Coordinates: 52.238°N 0.911°W

St James' End
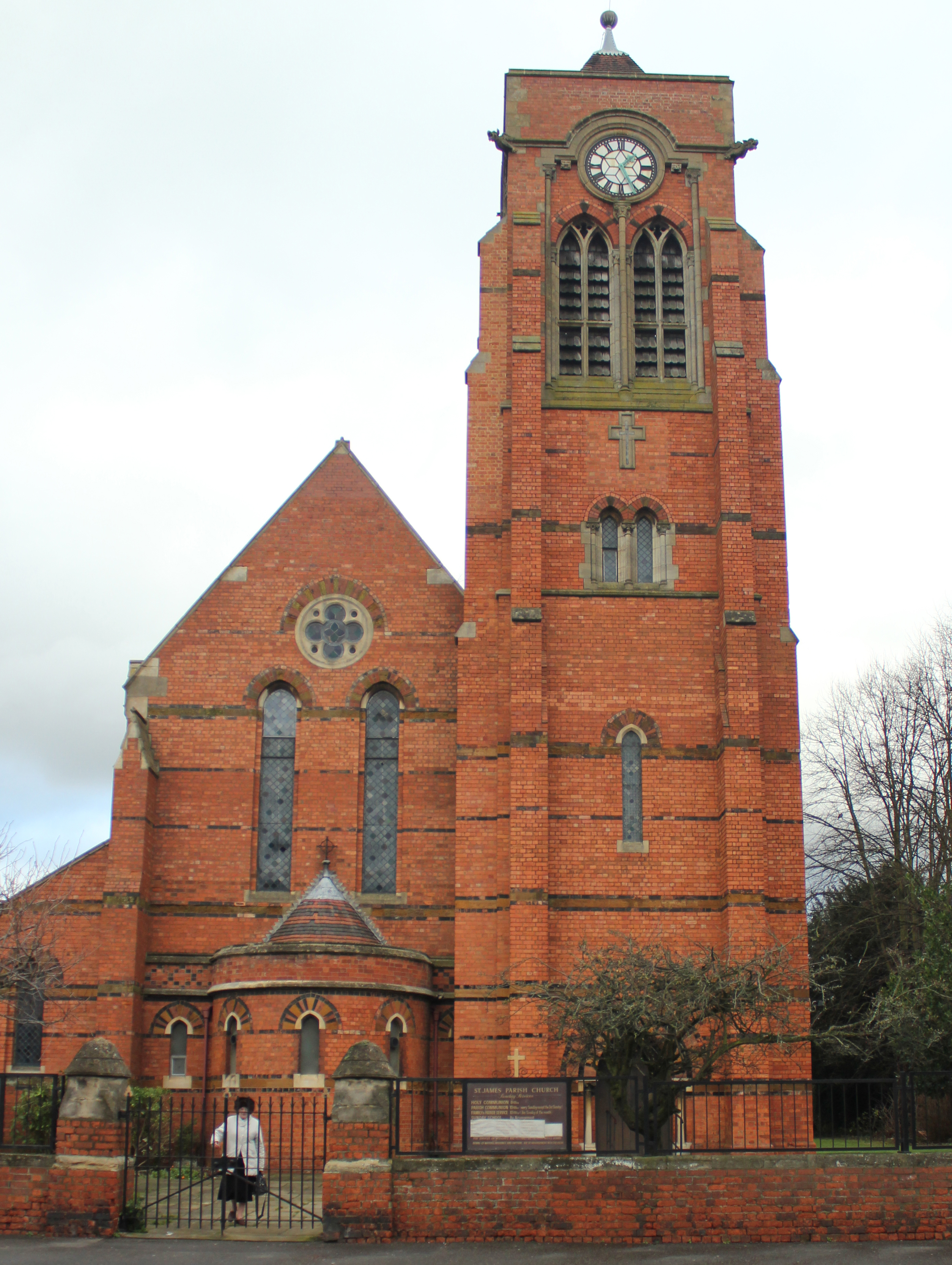
- St James' Parish Church, St James' Road

- Location within Northamptonshire
- Population: 5,465 (Ward. 2011)
- OS grid reference: SP745605
  - London: 68 miles
- Civil parish: Northampton
- Unitary authority: West Northamptonshire
- Ceremonial county: Northamptonshire
- Region: East Midlands
- Country: England
- Sovereign state: United Kingdom
- Post town: NORTHAMPTON
- Postcode district: NN5
- Dialling code: 01604
- Police: Northamptonshire
- Fire: Northamptonshire
- Ambulance: East Midlands
- UK Parliament: Northampton South

St James End, also known as St James, and colloquially as Jimmy's End, is a district west of the town centre in Northampton, in the West Northamptonshire district, in the ceremonial county of Northamptonshire, England. The area developed from the mid to late 19th century particularly with the expansion of the shoe manufacturing and engineering industries, and also the extension of the railway from London in June 1882.

== History ==
=== Northampton Abbey ===
The area is named after St James' Abbey which was founded in the town 1104–05 by William Peverel as an Augustinian monastery dedicated to St James and which was built in the area of the modern development. The abbey was located in the Abbots Way area, off the south side of Weedon Road in the town (see map).

The former Express Lift factory, which included the lift-testing tower, was redeveloped for housing in 1999–2000. The site was known to occupy part of the precinct of the abbey. Excavations were carried out to determine the location and remains of any parts of the abbey.

The abbey and a cemetery were located. The main buildings were preserved beneath the new housing development. The cemetery of c.300 burials was excavated during winter 2000–2001. The bones were analysed to determine the health and burial practices in the late medieval population of Northampton.

294 burials were uncovered in well ordered rows, with many wooden coffins, graves lined with old ceramic roof-tiles, stone-lined graves and a single stone coffin suggesting the occupants of relatively high status.

Use of the cemetery later was less orderly. Burials were in simple, shallow graves with just a shroud. On the south side was a stone-built building with two mortuary chapels. One had a stone-lined tomb, and a fragment of life-sized sculptured leg, with chain mail and a stirrup strap from a broken effigy. This may have happened at the dissolution of the abbey in 1538.

A highly decorated grave slab and the remains of two skeletons had been unearthed in 1970.

Analysis of the burials shows a large number of elderly people many having suffered from trauma such as leg fractures, fused and/or deformed leg joints and advanced spine degeneration. Many of these may have died in the abbey infirmary and further analysis is being undertaken.

=== First World War ===
On 19 October 1917 at 10.45 pm German Zeppelins dropped bombs near Burghley Park then passed over Northampton dropping nine incendiary bombs over Kingsthorpe, Dallington and Far Cotton. Another fell on the roof of 46 Parkwood Street on St James, probably aiming for Northampton railway station.

The house was occupied by Henry Gammons, a railway bricklayer, who was away at the time. His wife, Eliza Gammons, and twin daughters Gladys and Lily, aged 13, were in bed. The bomb passed through the house to the bedroom, killing the mother instantly and set fire to the room. Both mother and daughters were killed.

== Governance ==
The St James area today forms part of the civil parish of Northampton in West Northamptonshire.

When significant development in the area began in the nineteenth century, it was outside the borough boundaries of Northampton, in the neighbouring parishes of Dallington and Duston. An ecclesiastical parish called "St James, Dallington" was created in 1872 covering parts of the two older parishes. The neighbouring local government district of Hardingstone (which had been created in 1871 covering the Far Cotton area) was enlarged in 1874 to also include the new ecclesiastical parish of St James.

Local government districts were reconstituted as urban districts under the Local Government Act 1894, which also said that parishes could no longer straddle district boundaries. The parts of the civil parishes of Dallington and Duston within the urban district of Hardingstone therefore became separate parishes called "Dallington St James" and "Duston St James". The urban district was divided into two urban districts called Far Cotton and St James in 1896, with the St James Urban District comprising the two civil parishes of Dallington St James and Duston St James. The St James Urban District was short-lived; it was abolished four years later in 1900 and absorbed into the county borough of Northampton. The two civil parishes continued to exist until 1913, but as urban parishes they never had parish councils, always being directly governed by the urban district or borough councils above them.

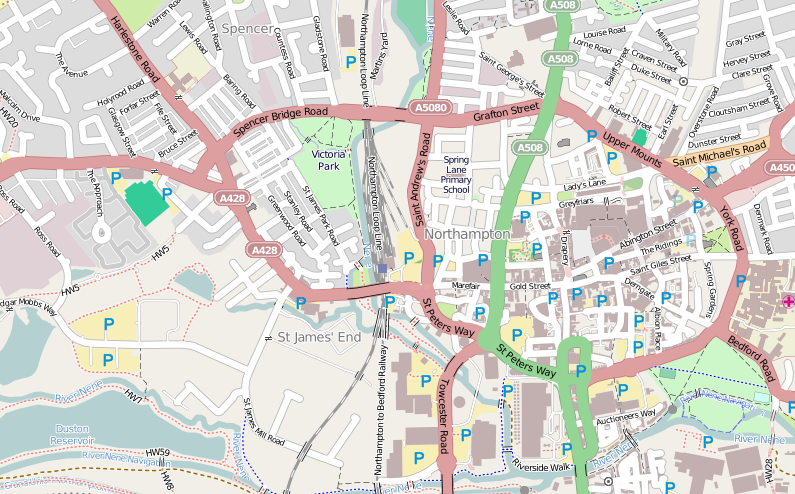
Locations of monastic houses in Northampton

== Notable buildings ==
St James today is most notable for the presence of the National Lift Tower in Weedon Road, formerly the Express Lift Tower and nicknamed the 'Northampton Lighthouse'. The building is a lift-testing tower built by the Express Lift Company which closed in 1990. The building was officially opened by Queen Elizabeth II on 12 November 1982.

The Church of England Parish Church of St James in St James' Road was built in 1868–71 by R. Wheeler of Tonbridge, Kent, with additional work in 1900 and the tower in 1920. The brick is exposed inside and enriched with black bricks.

The Doddridge Centre in St James Road was built in 1895 as the Doddridge Memorial Chapel in memory of Philip Doddridge (1702–1751), an English Nonconformist. It provides facilities and support to community and voluntary groups with 30 groups based in the building and another 40 using it as a meeting point for a variety of activities.

The chapel where Doddridge served from 1729–51 is in Doddridge Street on the east side of the river. It dates from 1695 and is now a United Reformed Church. The interior has galleries, box pews and a memorial to Doddridge.

St James is home to the Northampton Saints Rugby Football Club at Franklin's Gardens stadium on the south-west side of lower Weedon Road. The club was established in 1880 under the original title of Northampton St James by Rev Samuel Wathen Wigg, a clergyman and curate of St James' Church. The Sixfields Stadium used by Northampton Town Football Club (known as "The Cobblers") at the top end of Weedon road in the area known as Sixfields currently playing in League Division Two. The Sixfields area also has a large Sainsbury's supermarket, Boots, M&S Simply Food, Wickes, McDonald's, several restaurants, a multi-screen cinema, and several other retail outlets.

The First Northampton bus service operated out of the former Northampton Transport depot on St James's Road but withdrew services on 14 September 2013. The depot remained in operation until 22 October 2013 to service the First Northampton operated Luton Airport Parkway railway station – Luton Airport service. It was then transferred to First Essex's Chelmsford depot.

This left the large depot empty. It had been opened in 1904 as the main depot for electric trams and then in the 1920s for motorbuses. Between then and 1939 it was extended considerably, but in 2013 the last service bus left and the depot was made redundant. In 2014 the site was acquired for expansion by Church's Shoes which has a factory next door. As of November 2022 the depot site remains unused and enclosed by Church's-branded hoarding.

== Industry ==
=== Former works ===
The Express Lift factory closed in 1990 having been a major employer (see notable buildings). Mettoy had a large site, originally used as a boot factory, at the corner of Spencer Bridge Road and Harlestone Road, NN5 7AE, now occupied by Aldi and Iceland supermarkets.

=== Current establishments ===
On St James Road between Sharman Road and Spencer Street is the factory of Church's the up-market footwear manufacturer founded in 1873 by Thomas Church. The company is now owned by Prada. As at November 2022 plans to expand the factory into a part of the redundant bus depot next door remain unrealised. (The depot site remains enclosed by Church's branded hoarding but untouched since 2014). The front entrance to the building has images of a Native American (see gallery).

This reflects the previous ownership by the company Padmore and Barnes; they produced footwear using a moccasin construction, and a Native American was their emblem; they produced some 6,000 pairs of moccasins in the first half of the 20th century. A statue stood at the top of the front of the building but was removed when the works closed.

The large and thriving St James Industrial Estate along St James Mill Road near West Bridge is host to a large number of business and industrial establishments including the headquarters of Cosworth Engineering.

== Traffic issues ==
Both St James Road and Spencer Bridge Road feed into Weedon Road and are the main exits to the M1 motorway at junction 16. All these roads are busy 24/7 with heavy traffic, fumes and noise from vehicles. A recent report for Northampton Borough Council states: "Existing conditions within the study area show poor air quality, with concentrations of nitrogen dioxide exceeding the annual mean objective along Weedon Road and St James’ Road near to the development site. An AQMA (Air quality management area) has been declared for this area".

== 1998 floods ==
The part of St James in St James Road and the lower parts of Harlestone Road and Weedon Road are low lying and in the flood plain of the River Nene and its tributaries. In April 1998, many residents of both St James had to leave their homes and seek temporary accommodation elsewhere, after part of the area, along with Far Cotton and Cotton End, suffered flooding, when the Nene broke its banks after torrential rain. Flooding occurred on Good Friday, 10 April 1998. Since then river banks have been raised and flood mitigation lakes created west of the town (see gallery).

== Area maps and views ==
=== 2014 map ===
There is no exact de-lineation of the St James area – the red outline on the modern map shown below gives the area generally regarded as St James. This differs from official designations of Borough Council Wards and County Council Divisions which often include additional areas used to even up the numbers of voters. The northern area comprises what are known as the 'Scottish streets' after their street names. On the west side, off Weedon Road, is the Lift Tower estate and several side roads up the hill to Sixfields.

In the south is the large and thriving St James Industrial Estate along St James Mill Road. Part of the St James area extends east of the railway into St James retail park.

The eastern part of St James lies just west of a tributary of the River Nene and the railway station and was the first part of the area to be developed for housing and industrial use in the mid and late 19th century as can be seen from the 1899 map. This area extends to Spencer Bridge Road in the north beyond which is the area of the town known as Spencer, after the Spencer family of Althorp, about 5 miles north, however the area includes the houses nearest to Harlestone Road including St James Church of England Primary School. This is the only school in the St James area and has nearly 500 pupils aged 3 to 11. The school was rated 'good' at the last OFSTED inspection.

Part of the area south-west of St James Road appear on the 1899 map such as Abbey Street, Almad Street, Lincoln Road and Spencer Street. Other areas further up Weedon Road have terraced houses on the 1899 map but have been cleared for three blocks of council flats close to Franklin's Gardens stadium.

=== 1899 map ===
The eastern part of St James was the first area to be developed for housing and industrial use in the mid and late 19th century as this map shows. There are three shoe factories shown, a tannery, saw mills and a cycle works. The railway arrived from London, Euston in 1881 on a loop line from the main line north of the village of Roade, although a connection to Market Harborough and further north was in place earlier.

The large goods area at the railway station reflects the main method of goods transit at the time. What is now Victoria Park is shown on the map as a recreation ground. The park was opened in 1898 on land donated by Earl Spencer of Althorp. At that time it was half the present size. Further land was acquired from the Earl in 1910 and 1911. As of August 2021 it has a children's play area, a changing rooms building used by visiting football teams, static outdoor exercise equipment and a multipurpose enclosed sports pitch (remodelled from previous tennis courts). The former bowling green was removed c.2000.

=== Gallery ===
2014 map of St James End: the red area is the usual limit of the area - see text

Extract from Ordnance survey map dated 1899 showing part of the St James are west of Northampton railway station

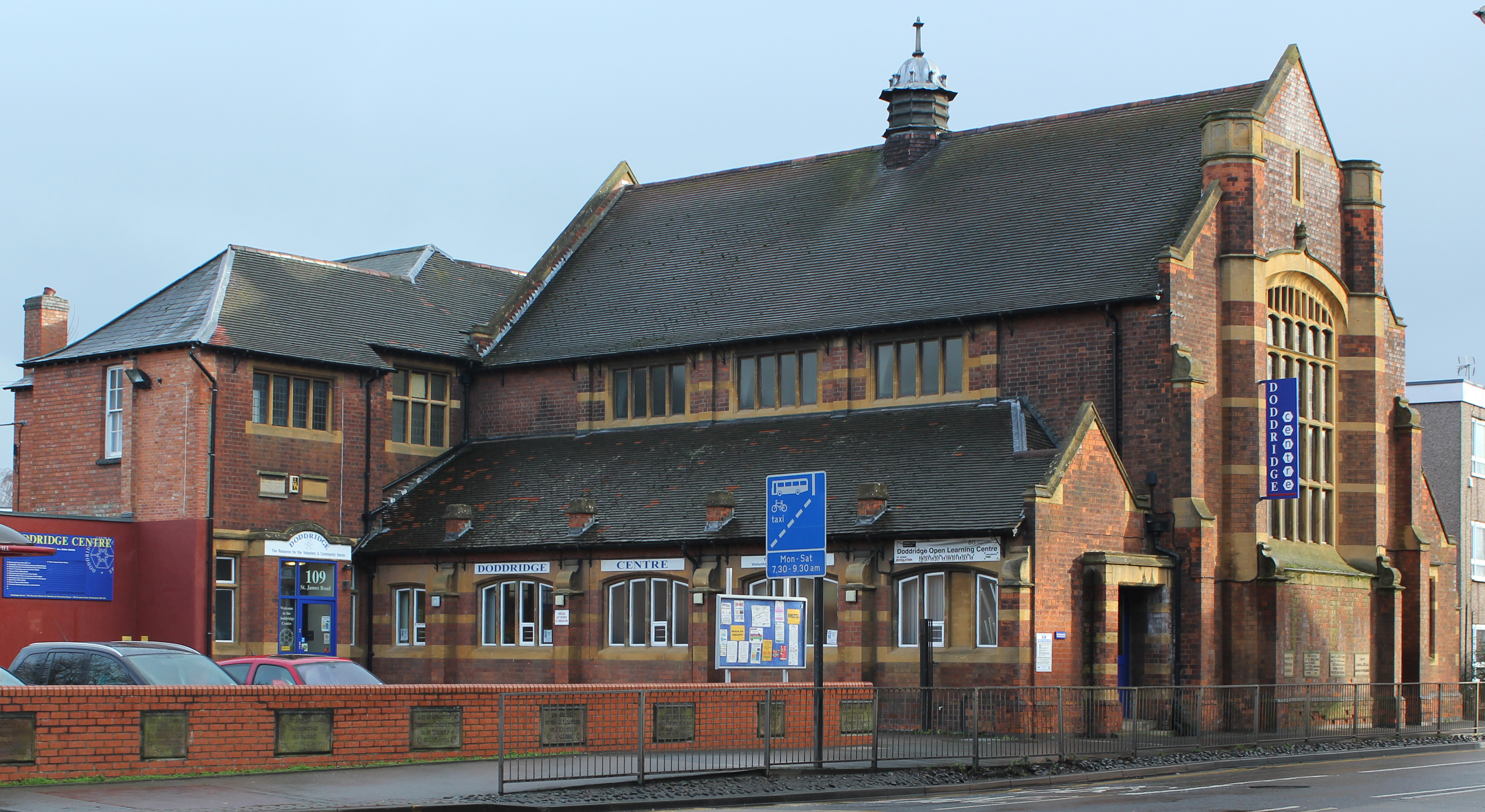
The Doddridge Centre in St James Road, about a 10-minute walk from the railway station

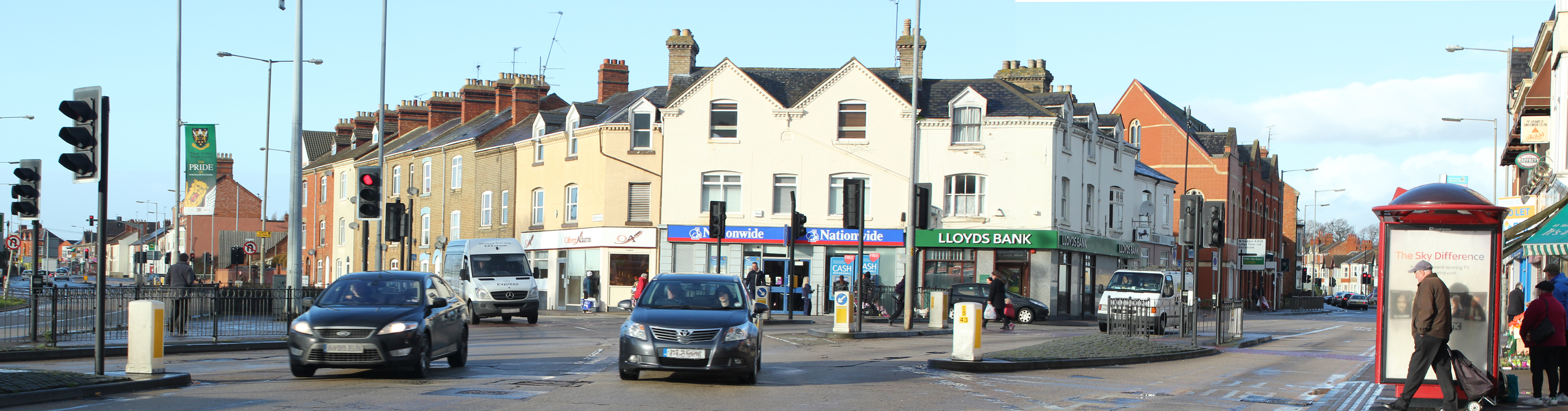
The busy junction of St James Road, Harlestone Road and Weedon Road off-peak

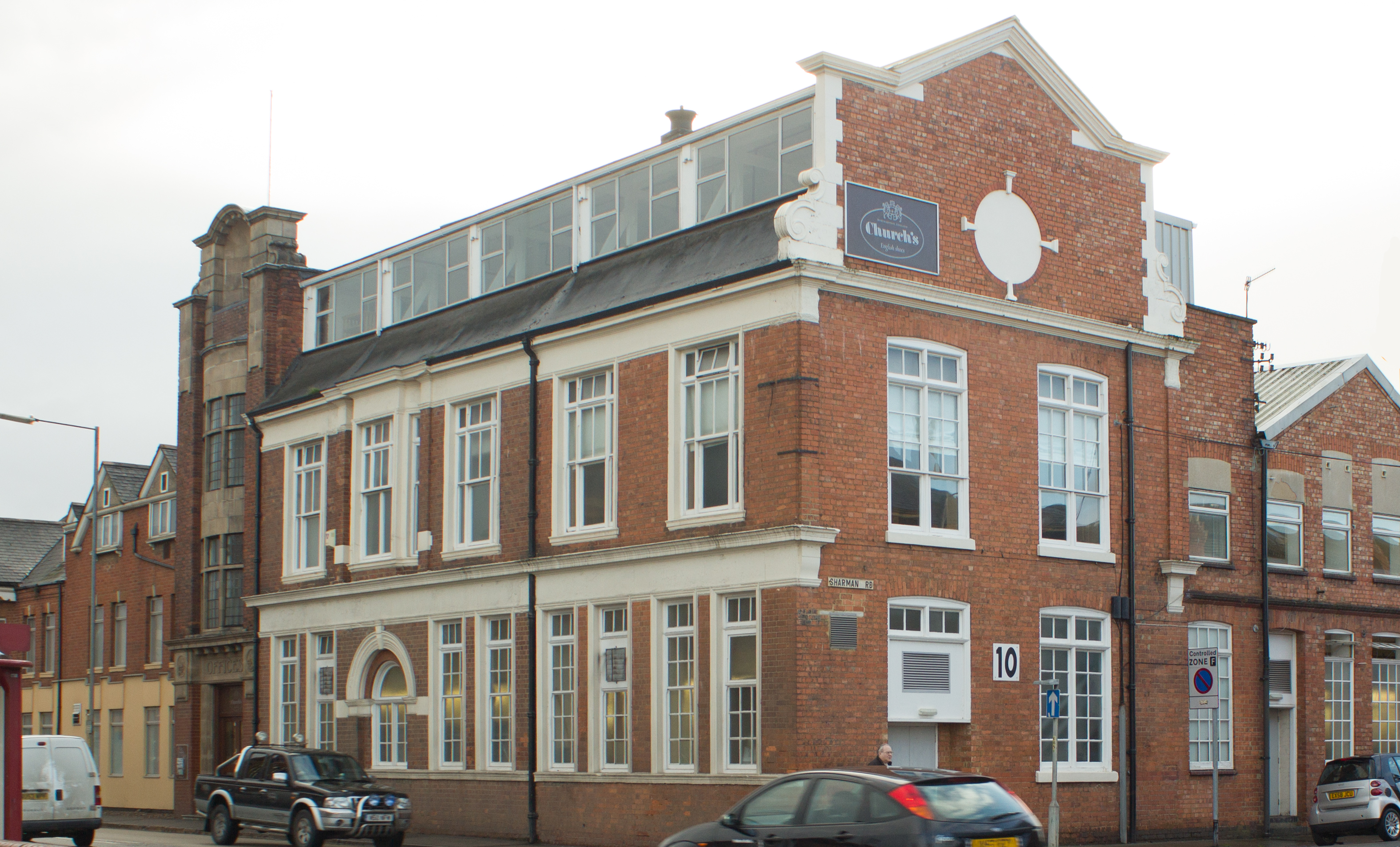
Church's shoe factory in St James Road

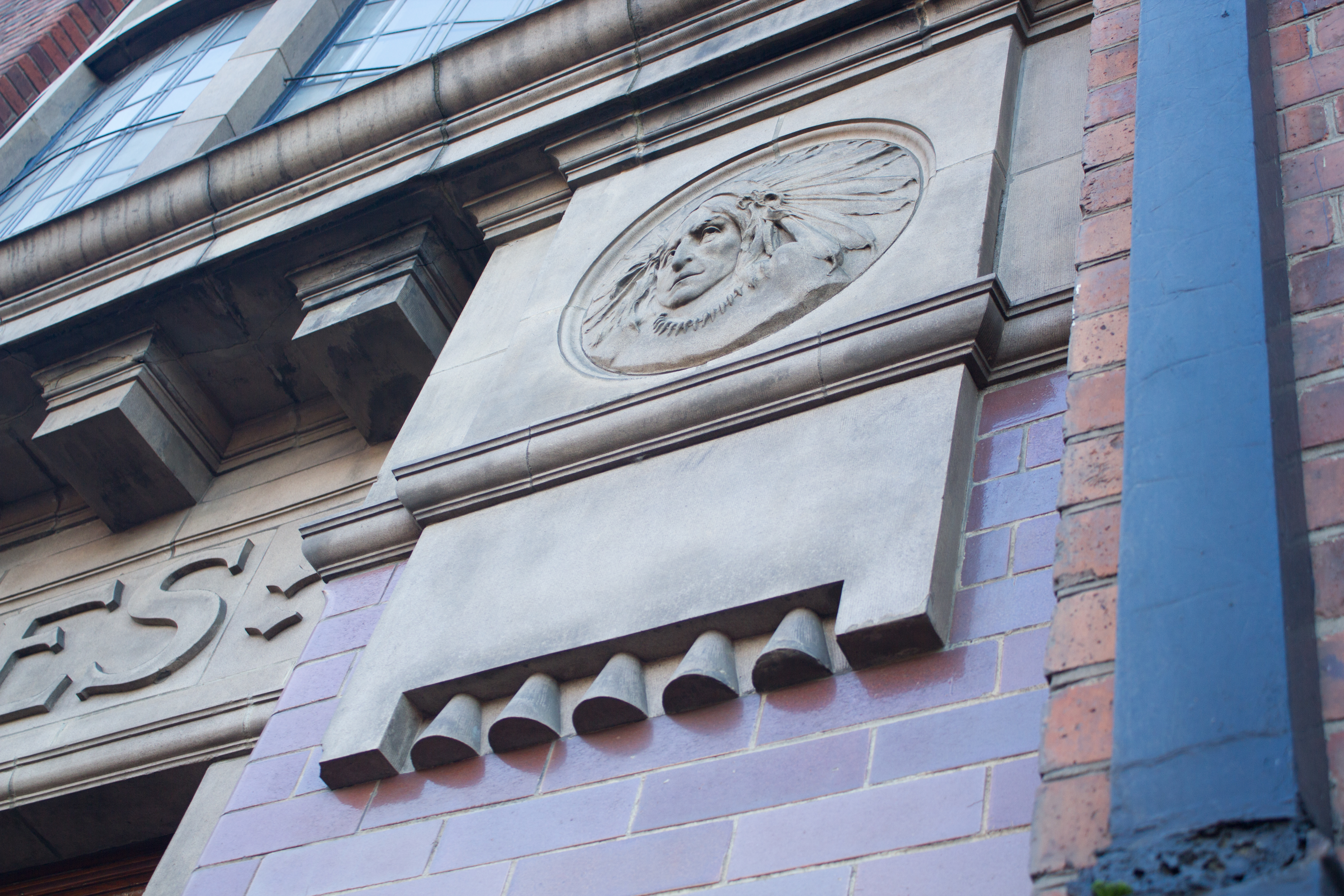
Indian image on Church's Shoe Factory main entrance - see text

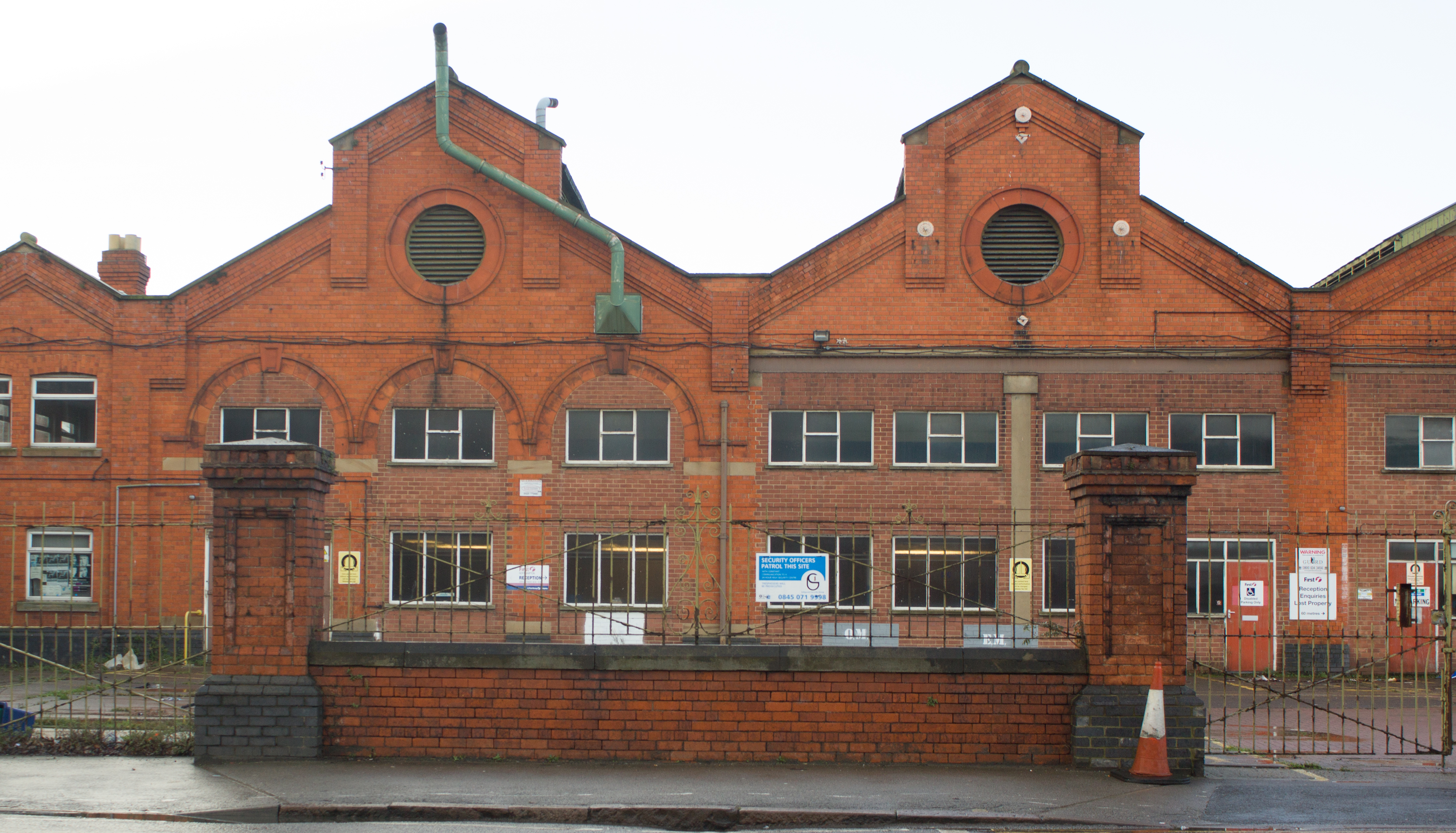
Former tram and bus depot, St James Road, derelict from 2013

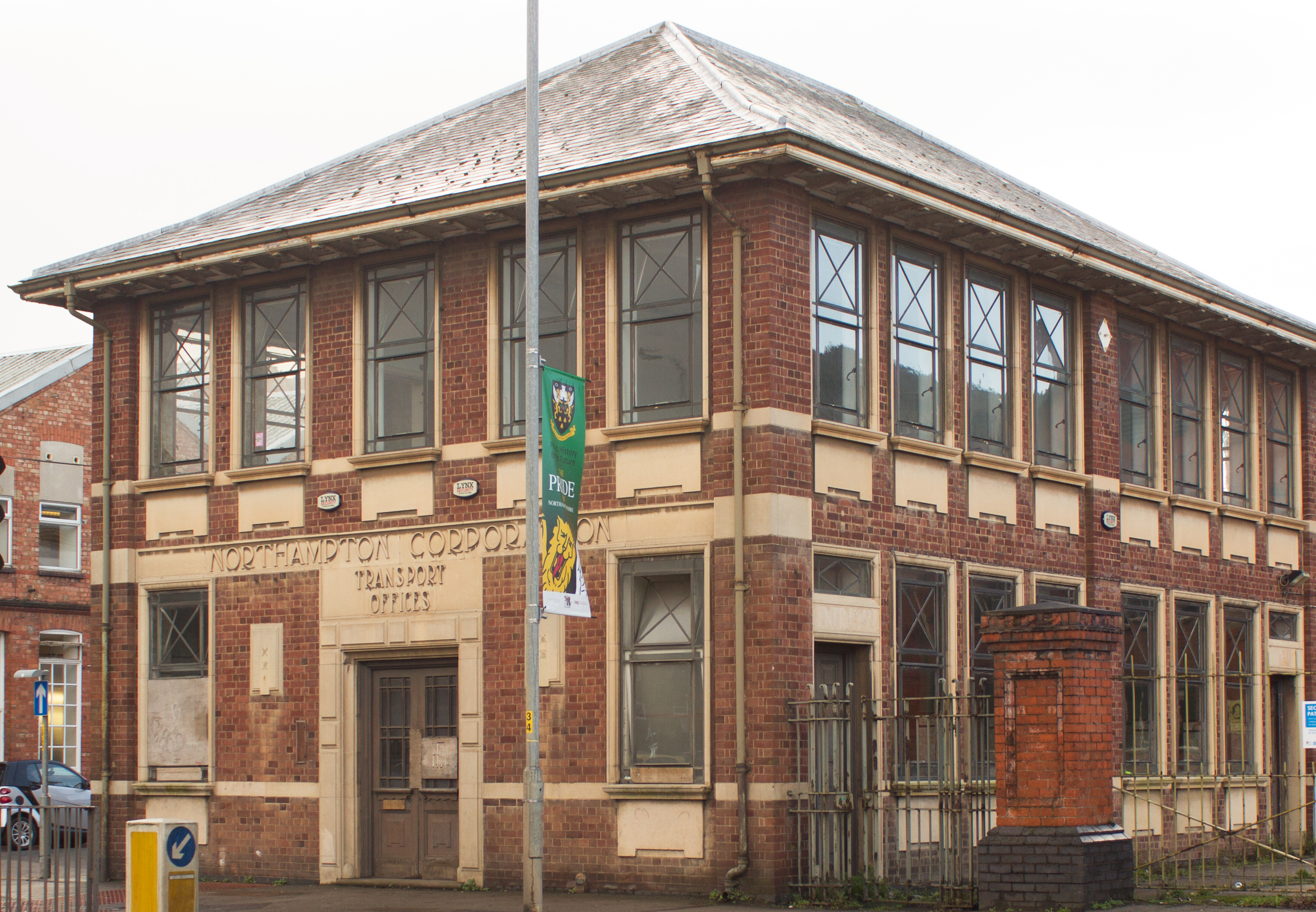
Long-abandoned stylish Northampton Corporation Transport Offices in St James Road

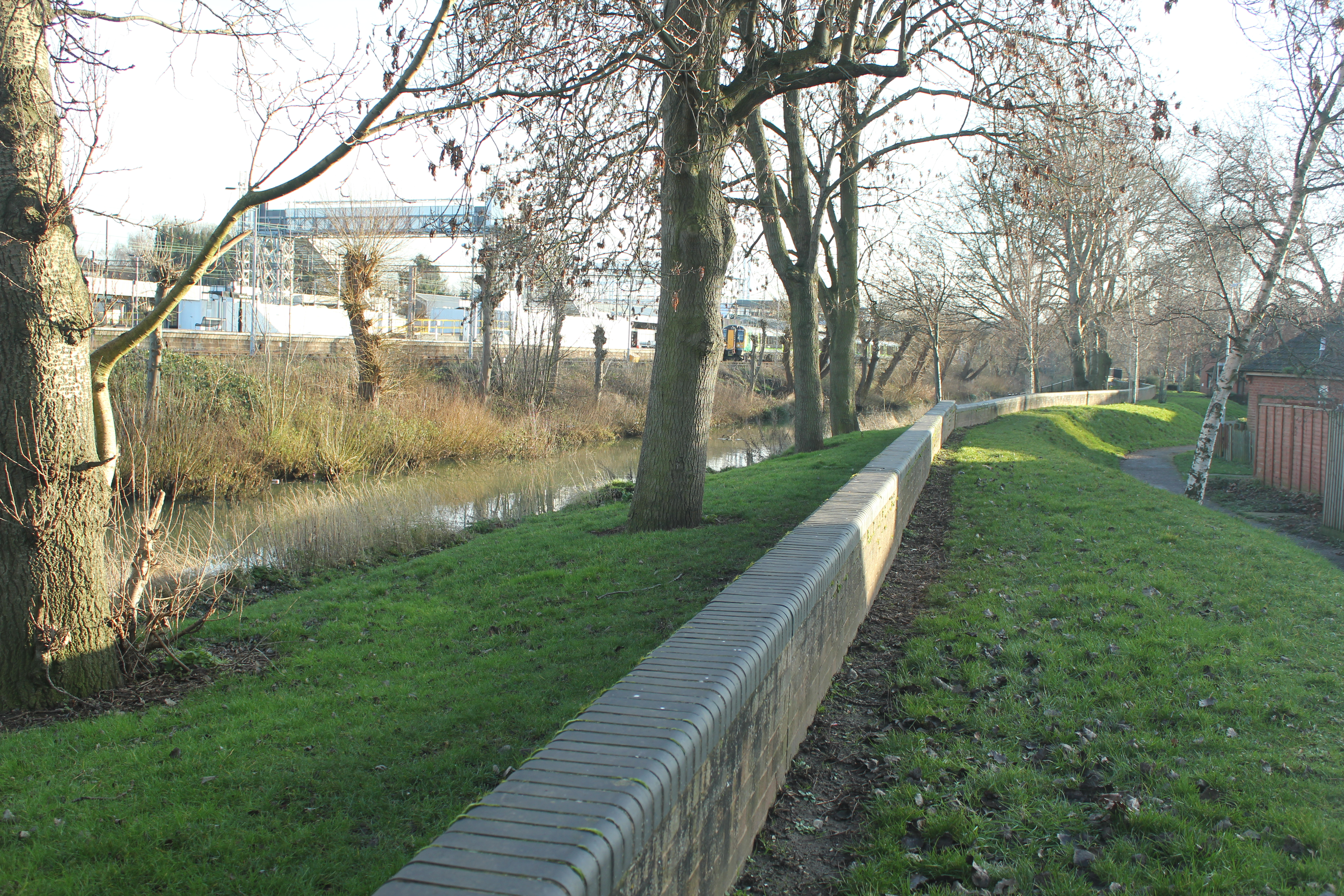
Flood defences: looking south on the east side of St James opposite Northampton station. The river runs north to south and is a tributary of the River Nene

== See also ==
- List of monastic houses in Northamptonshire
- 1998 Easter Floods
