= Bulstrode Preceptory =

Monastic house in Buckinghamshire, England

Coordinates: 51.58544°N 0.57773°W

Bulstrode Preceptory was a preceptory in Buckinghamshire, England. It was first mentioned in 1276.

== History ==
Little is known of Bulstrode Preceptory. It certainly existed in 1276, for in that year Brother John, the preceptor, was accused of taking a bribe of half a mark from a certain robber to let him go free. An inquisition taken in the year 1330 reported that the manor of Bulstrode had once formed part of the lands of the Knights Templar, and after the annulling of their order passed to the Knights Hospitaller. It is mentioned again among the lands of the Hospitallers in 1338, but they never had a commandery there: the manor was simply leased on their behalf for 75 marks. The Templars had also lands at Radnage and at High Wycombe.

== See also ==
- List of monastic houses in Buckinghamshire

== Notes ==
- This article is based on The Preceptory of Bulstrode , in The Victoria History of the County of Buckinghamshire: Volume 1, 1905
