= Victoria Park, Northampton =

Park in Northampton, England

Coordinates: 52.241°N 0.910°W

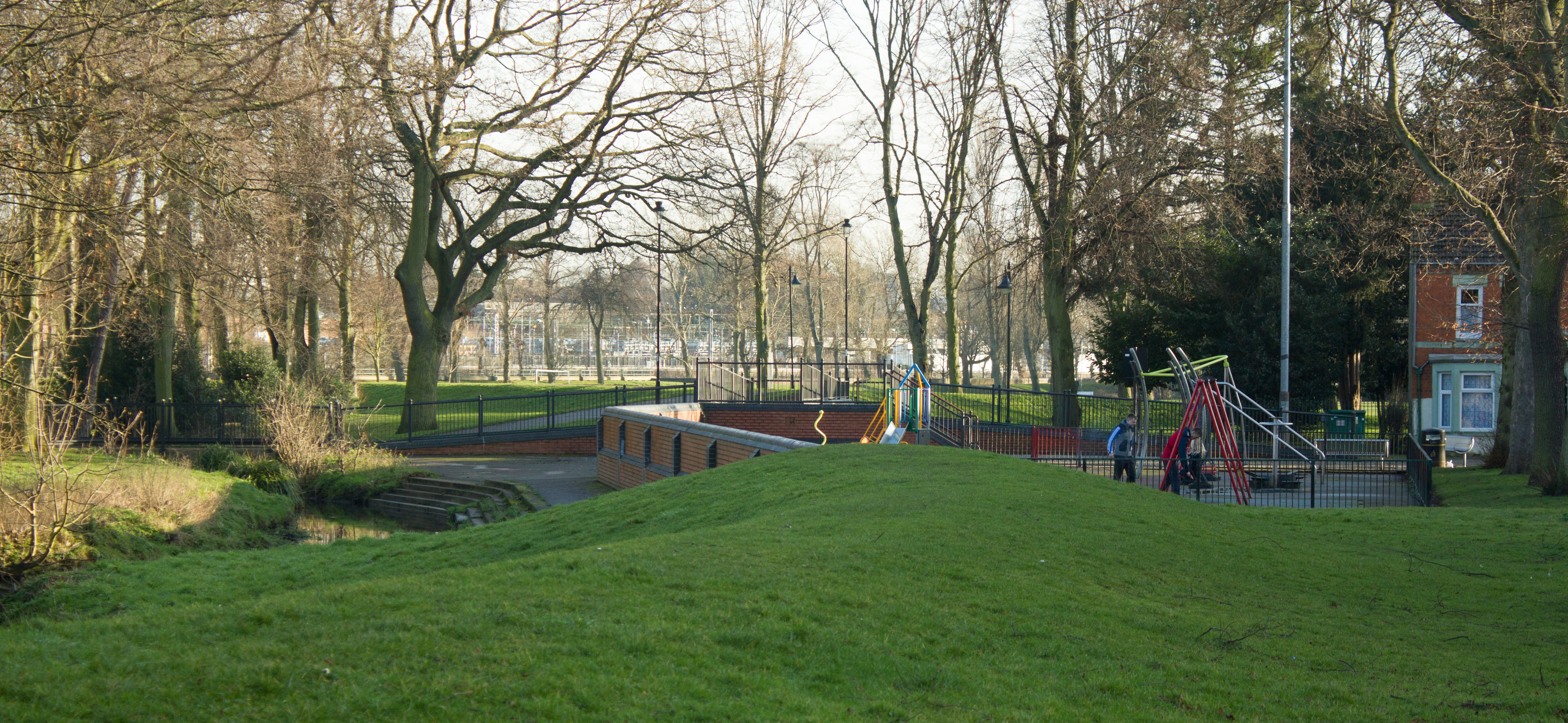
Victoria Park looking south over Dallington Brook, 2014

Victoria Park is a public green space in St James End, Northampton, England, south of Spencer Bridge Road. The park has open grass areas and lines and belts of trees. A stream, a tributary of the River Nene flows from north to south through the park on the east side next to the railway line. A small stream, Dallington Brook, also flows through the park from the north-west joining the Nene tributary. The park has an area of about 6.5 hectares.

== History ==
The park was opened in 1898 on land donated by the Earl Spencer of nearby Althorpe. At that time it was half the present size. Further land was acquired from the Earl in 1910 and 1911.

In 2007 the park was upgraded as part of a major regeneration project. New play equipment, lighting, landscaping, footpaths, park furniture and youth facilities have all given Victoria Park a new lease of life.

The southern part of St James in St James Road and the lower parts of Harlestone Road and Weedon Road flooded on 10 April 1998 (Good Friday) when the river Nene and its tributaries broke their banks after prolonged torrential rain. Since then river banks have been raised and flood mitigation lakes created west of the town.
