= Newton Longville Priory =

Priory in Buckinghamshire, England

Coordinates: 51.97435°N 0.7676°W

Newton Longville Priory was an alien priory in Newton Longville, Buckinghamshire, England. It was established in the 1150s and was dissolved in 1441.

== History ==
The priory of Newton Longville was founded by Walter Giffard as a cell to St. Faith's at Longueville near Rouen. The lands in Buckinghamshire which formed its endowment were granted to Cluny Abbey about 1150, and it seems probable that the English cell was built almost at once, as a grant of materials for the purpose was included in Walter Giffard's charter. Very little is known of the history of this house; it was immediately subject to St. Faith's, and exempt from episcopal jurisdiction. In 1277 Edward I sent the priory a gift of two tuns of wine. In 1331 the prior received a licence to go to the general chapter at Cluny with his suite. During the wars of the fourteenth century this priory probably suffered the same losses and inconveniences as other alien cells. It was finally granted to New College, Oxford, in 1441.

The original endowment consisted of the manors of Great Horwood, Newton Longville, Whaddon and Akeley, with their churches; tithes of other lands, fishpools and woods, and free pasture for stock, as well as all the monks might need for building purposes.

The temporalities of the priory in 1291 amounted to £14 9s. 5d. In 1279 the priory held Akeley and its church in frank-almoin, Great Horwood and its church, and the church of Whaddon. In 1302 it held the village of Akeley as one knight's fee and lands in Great Horwood. In 1316 it answered for Akeley, Newton Longville and Great Horwood; in 1346 for half a fee in Akeley.

== Priors of Newton Longville ==
- William, occurs 1236
- Peter, occurs 1262
- John de Panneville, occurs 1277
- Richard, occurs 1297
- William de Talley, occurs 1306

== See also ==
- List of monastic houses in Buckinghamshire

== Notes ==
- This article is based on The Cluniac Priory of Newton Longville, in The Victoria History of the County of Buckinghamshire: Volume 1, 1905
