= Weedon Beck Priory =

Monastery in Northamptonshire, England

Weedon Beck Priory, otherwise Weedon Bec Priory, was a Benedictine monastic cell in Weedon Bec, Northamptonshire, England. It was a dependency of Bec Abbey in Le Bec-Hellouin, Normandy. It was established after 1126 on an estate that already belonged to the abbey in 1086. Until 1291 it was administered from another Bec dependency, Ogbourne Priory, after 1291 by Bec directly. As an alien priory it was confiscated by Henry V in 1414, and its assets were given to Eton College in 1462.
