= Weedon Pinkney Priory =

Monastery in Northamptonshire, England

Monastery information
- Order: Benedictine
- Mother house: Abbey of St. Lucian, Beauvais, France
- Dedication: Blessed Virgin

Site
- Location: Weedon Lois, Northamptonshire, England

Weedon Pinkney Priory was a priory in Weedon Lois, Northamptonshire, England. It was established by Gilo de Pinkney during the reign of Henry I as a cell of the Abbey of St. Lucian, Beauvais (fr), and dedicated to the Blessed Virgin.

As an alien priory its wealth was taken by the crown during war with France. In 1392, the abbey already being destroyed by fire, the priory and all spiritual and temporal possessions and rights were conveyed to Biddlesden Abbey. A Royal Letter Patent of King Richard II in 1393 licensed the alienation, and in 1440 granted by the crown to the foundation of All Souls College, Oxford.
