= Wing Priory =

Benedictine priory in Buckinghamshire, England

Coordinates: 51.8905°N 0.7234°W

Wing Priory also Wenge Priory was a medieval monastic house in Buckinghamshire, England.
