= St James Abbey, Northampton =

Abbey in Northampton, England

Coordinates: 52.24°N 0.9°W

The St James Abbey, also known as Northampton Abbey, was founded in Northampton in 1104–05 by William Peverel, as a house of Augustinian canons, and was dedicated to St James. William Peverel endowed it with some forty acres in nearby Duston, the church of Duston, and the parish's mill.

The abbey's endowments were quickly increased and within a century the abbey was in possession of ten churches, mostly in Northamptonshire; in addition to these, the abbey also held farms, or received rents from some thirty different parishes in the county.

One account concerning the abbey notes, "On the forfeiture of Peverel the manor of Duston was granted by Henry II to Walkelin de Duston, who afterwards adopted the religious habit and entered the abbey of St James, of which he subsequently became abbot." The abbey church was rebuilt on a large scale during the reign of King Edward I and completed in around 1310. By the time of the dissolution it was reported that the monastery was well kept, the community held in high esteem and with a lot of good done for the poor of the area. Nonetheless, it was dissolved in 1538 and granted to Nicholas Giffard who converted the buildings into a mansion.

The abbey was located in the Abbots Way area, off the south side of Weedon Road in the town. The former Express Lift factory including the lift-testing tower, was redeveloped for housing in 1999–2000. The site was known to occupy part of the precinct of the abbey. Excavations were carried out to determine the location and remains of any parts of the abbey. The abbey and a cemetery were located. The main buildings were preserved beneath the new housing development. The cemetery of c.300 burials was excavated during winter 2000–2001. The bones were analysed to determine the health and burial practices in the late medieval population of Northampton.

294 burials were uncovered in well ordered rows, with many wooden coffins, graves lined with old ceramic roof-tiles, stone-lined graves and a single stone coffin suggesting the occupants of relatively high status. Use of the cemetery later was less orderly. Burials were in simple, shallow graves with just a shroud. On the south side was a stone-built building with two mortuary chapels. One had a stone-lined tomb, and a fragment of life-sized sculptured leg, with chain mail and a stirrup strap from a broken effigy. This may have happened at the dissolution of the abbey in 1538. A highly decorated grave slab and the remains of two skeletons had been unearthed in 1970.

Analysis of the burials shows a large number of elderly people many having suffered from trauma such as leg fractures, fused and/or deformed leg joints and advanced spine degeneration. Many of these may have died in the abbey infirmary and further analysis is being undertaken.

Nothing now remains except the tomb slab of Abbott de Flore in the vestry of Duston church.

== Burials ==
- John Catesby
- Sir John de Grey, 3rd Baron Grey de Rotherfield
- Richard Woodville, 3rd Earl Rivers

== See also ==
- St James End, Northampton - the district of the modern town where the abbey was established
