= National Lift Tower =

Lift-testing tower and landmark in Northampton, England

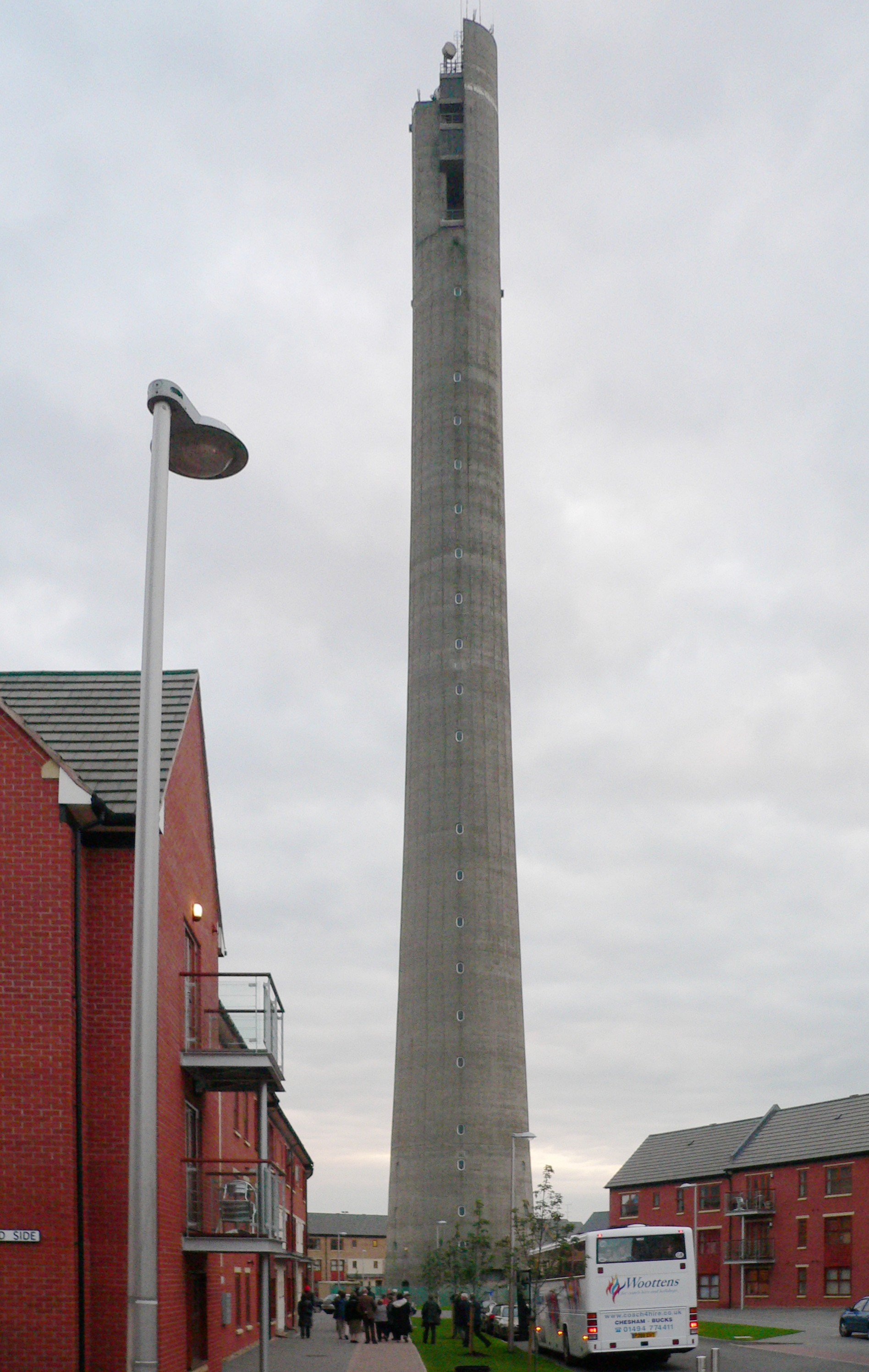
- National Lift Tower in 2005

- Location within Northamptonshire
- Former names: Express Lift Tower

General information
- Status: Completed
- Type: Tower
- Location: Tower Square, Northampton, England
- Coordinates: 52.23850°N 0.92200°W
- Construction started: 1980
- Completed: 1982
- Inaugurated: 12 November 1982
- Renovated: July 2010
- Client: Express Lifts Limited

Height
- Height: 127.5 m (418 ft)

Dimensions
- Diameter: 14.6 m (48 ft)
- Other dimensions: Diameter at top 8.5 m (28 ft)

Technical details
- Floor count: 19
- Lifts/elevators: 5 or 6

Listed Building – Grade II
- Official name: Express Lift Tower, Northampton
- Designated: 30 October 1997
- Reference no.: 1031518

Design and construction
- Architect: Maurice Walton of Stimpson Walton Bond

Website
- nationallifttower.com

The National Lift Tower (previously called the Express Lift Tower) is a lift-testing tower built by the Express Lift Company (a lifts division of the General Electric Company) off Weedon Road in Northampton, England. The structure was commissioned in 1978 with construction commencing in 1980 and was officially opened by Queen Elizabeth II on 12 November 1982. It has been a Grade II Listed Building since 1997.

The tower can be viewed from Arbury Hill, the highest point in Northamptonshire.

== Background ==
=== The site ===
The tower is in St James End, west of Northampton town centre. The area is named after Northampton Abbey, an Augustinian monastery dedicated to St James, which was founded in 1104–1105. When the former Express Lift factory, which included the lift-testing tower, was redeveloped for housing in 1999–2000, excavations were carried out to determine the location and remains of any parts of the abbey. A cemetery of c. 300 burials was excavated during winter 2000–2001. The bones were analysed to determine the health and burial practices in the late-medieval population of Northampton.

=== Construction ===
Designed by architect Maurice Walton of Stimpson Walton Bond, the tower is 127.5 metres (418 ft 4 in) tall, 14.6 m (47 ft 11 in) in diameter at the base and tapers to 8.5 m (27 ft 11 in) at the top. The only lift-testing tower in Britain, and one of only two in Europe, it was granted Grade II listed building status on 30 October 1997, making it the youngest listed building in the UK at the time. The building's small, obround shaped windows were a design motif of the Express Lift Company, whose lift control panels featured control buttons and floor indicators of the same shape.

In January 1997, the tower fell out of use after Express was taken over by Otis (who typically used its test facilities in the United States). In 1999, the tower and surrounding land was sold to Wilcon Homes for development.

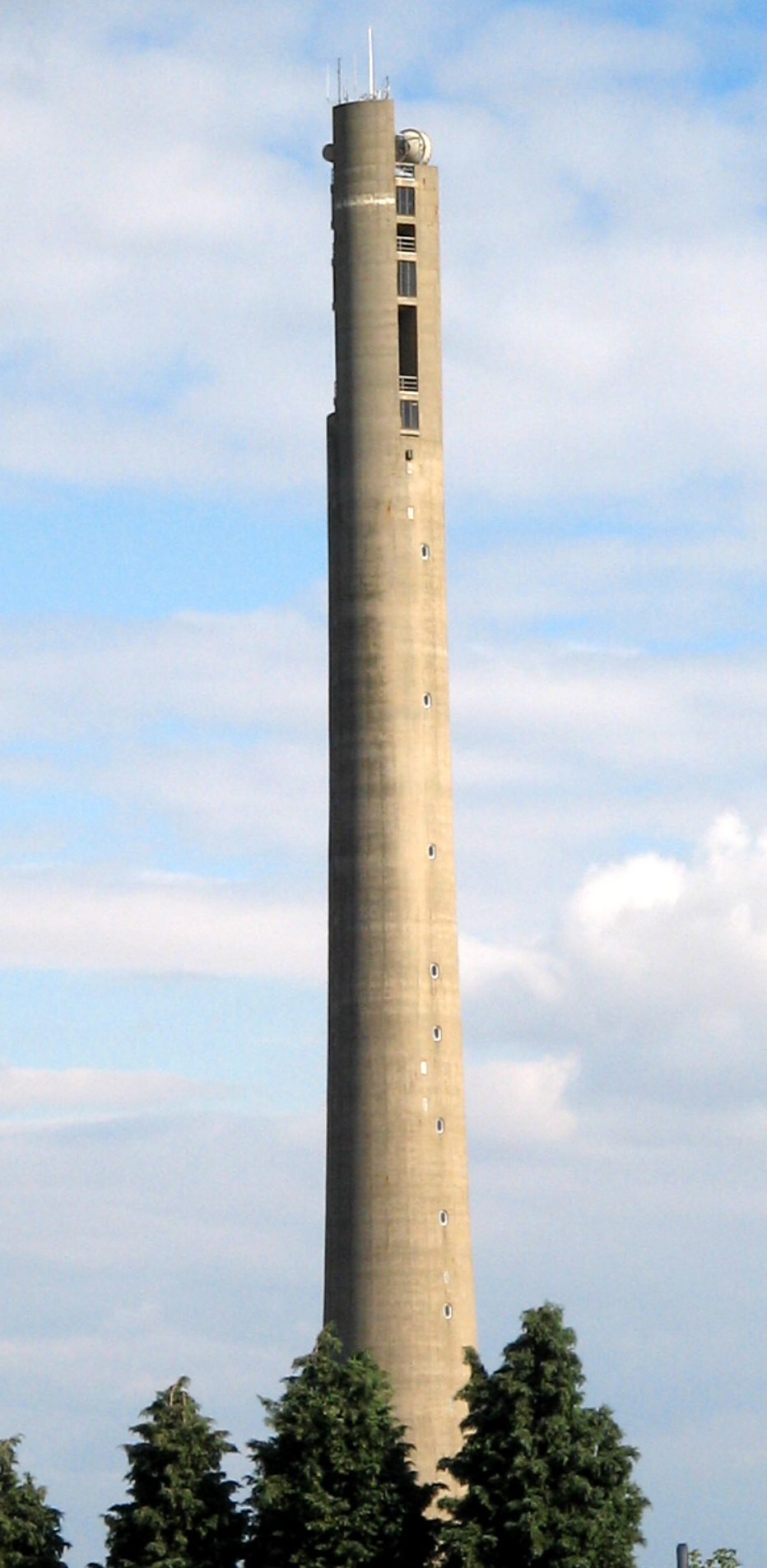
The tower in 2006

From the time it was built, one shaft was specifically used by the British Standards Institution (BSI) for type testing of lift safety components at the time under the BS 5655 and BS EN81 standards. Safety Gear testing involved putting the lift cars (frame) into free fall conditions with rated mass at tripping speeds as required by the designers of the safety gear to ensure the lift cars decelerated and stopped within the requirements of the standard. Buffer testing involved impacting them with the maximum and minimum mass at tripping speeds to ensure decelerations were within that requirement by the standard in both cases the aim was to ensure if the lift ever went into free fall or uncontrolled downward movement the safety components stopped the lift without causing any serious injury to the occupant. BSI ceased using the test tower soon after the site was acquired for housing in 1997–1998.

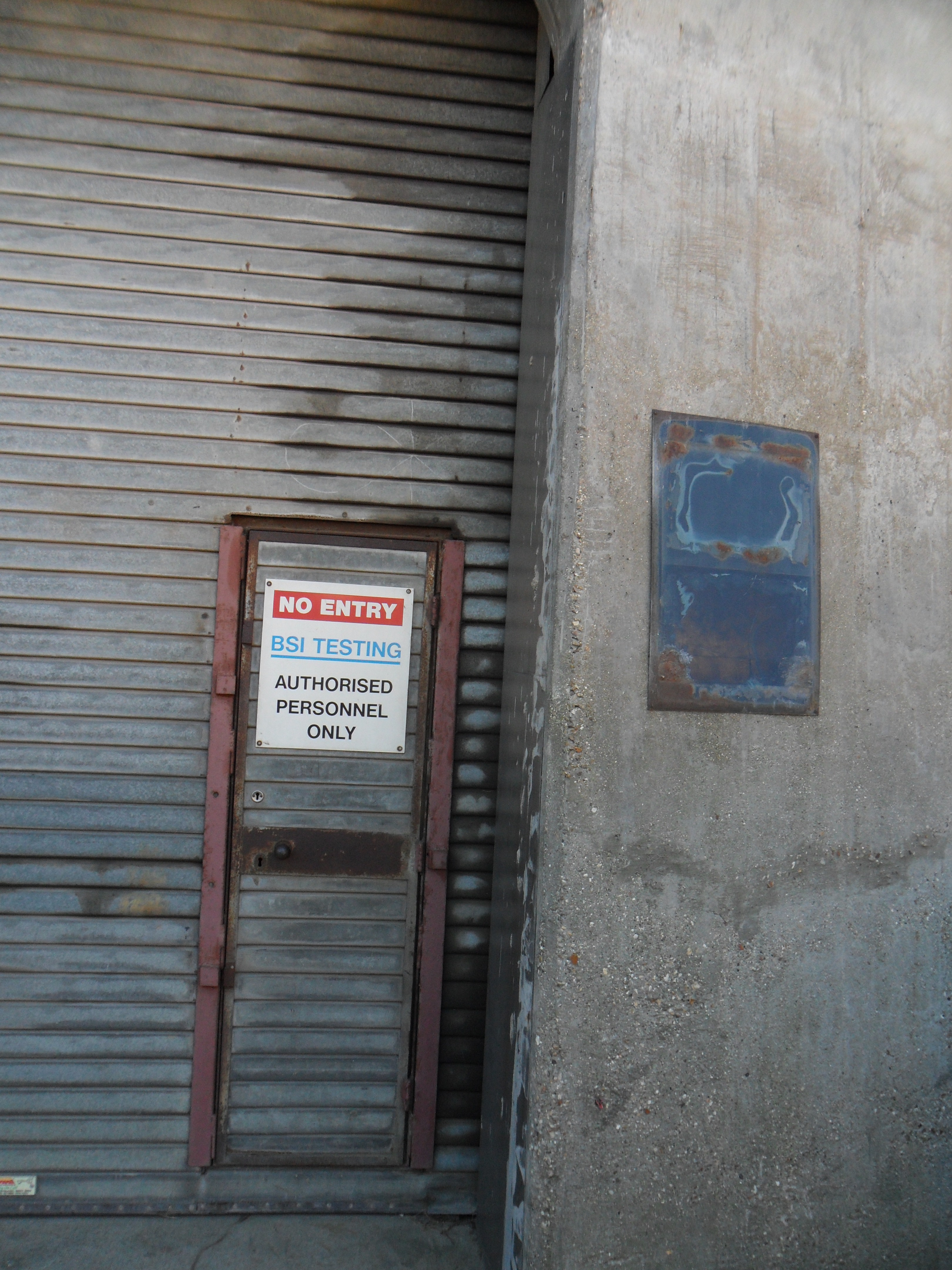
BSI Shaft

The building is now privately owned and has been renamed the National Lift Tower. Following extensive renovation and repairs, the tower was re-opened for business in October 2009. The tower is used by lift companies for research, development, testing and marketing. As well as being a resource for the lift industry, the building is also available to companies requiring tall vertical spaces, for example companies wishing to test working-at-height safety devices.

There are six lift shafts of varying heights and speeds, including a high-speed shaft with a travel of 100 metres (328 ft 1 in) and a theoretical maximum speed of 10 m/s (33 ft/s).

The tower's renovation was officially completed in July 2010. Further building work was planned with planning permission being sought to build a visitor's centre incorporating a 100-seater auditorium and cafe. However, permission for this structure was denied by Northampton Borough Council in March 2012.

Abseiling at the tower has been going on since May 2011 with over £140,000 having been raised for charity in the period to May 2012. Northampton Borough Council has now granted approval for it to be used up to 24 times a year for abseiling.

As of 2015, the tower was being used as the world's tallest drainage-testing facility.

=== Local radio broadcasting ===
The tower once housed a transmitter on the top of it, for broadcasting community radio station Revolution Radio on FM 96.1 MHz, which launched on 12 June 2021. But due to constant late rent payments were removed from the tower.

== Mentions ==
- The tower featured prominently in a 1993 episode of the Channel 4 educational programme The Secret Life of Machines (Series 3, Episode 1), in which Tim Hunkin demonstrates the operation of the high-speed lift in the tower.
- The tower was lampooned by broadcaster Terry Wogan as the "Northampton lighthouse". He wrote a section of the book Icons of Northamptonshire (2014) about it.
- The Northampton Chronicle & Echo published an article for April Fools' Day 2008, claiming that the lift tower would be pulled down. Comments were made on the paper's website regarding the lack of respect of the local council for not publicly announcing it. Another April Fools' Day story in the same paper suggested the tower would be redeveloped as a mooring station for airships.
- The Lift Tower is featured in the science fiction novel Time to Repair by Mark Gallard.

== See also ==
- List of towers
- Express Lifts history booklet from 1982 includes internal diagrams of the tower
- Smith, Tony (4 July 2013), "Love in an elevator.... testing mast: The National Lift Tower", The Register, "The Tower rises above the flat plain of the Nene valley near Northampton like some kind of latter-day Barad Dûr or Orthanc."
