= Sixfields Stadium =

Football stadium

Coordinates: 52°14′7″N 0°56′0″W

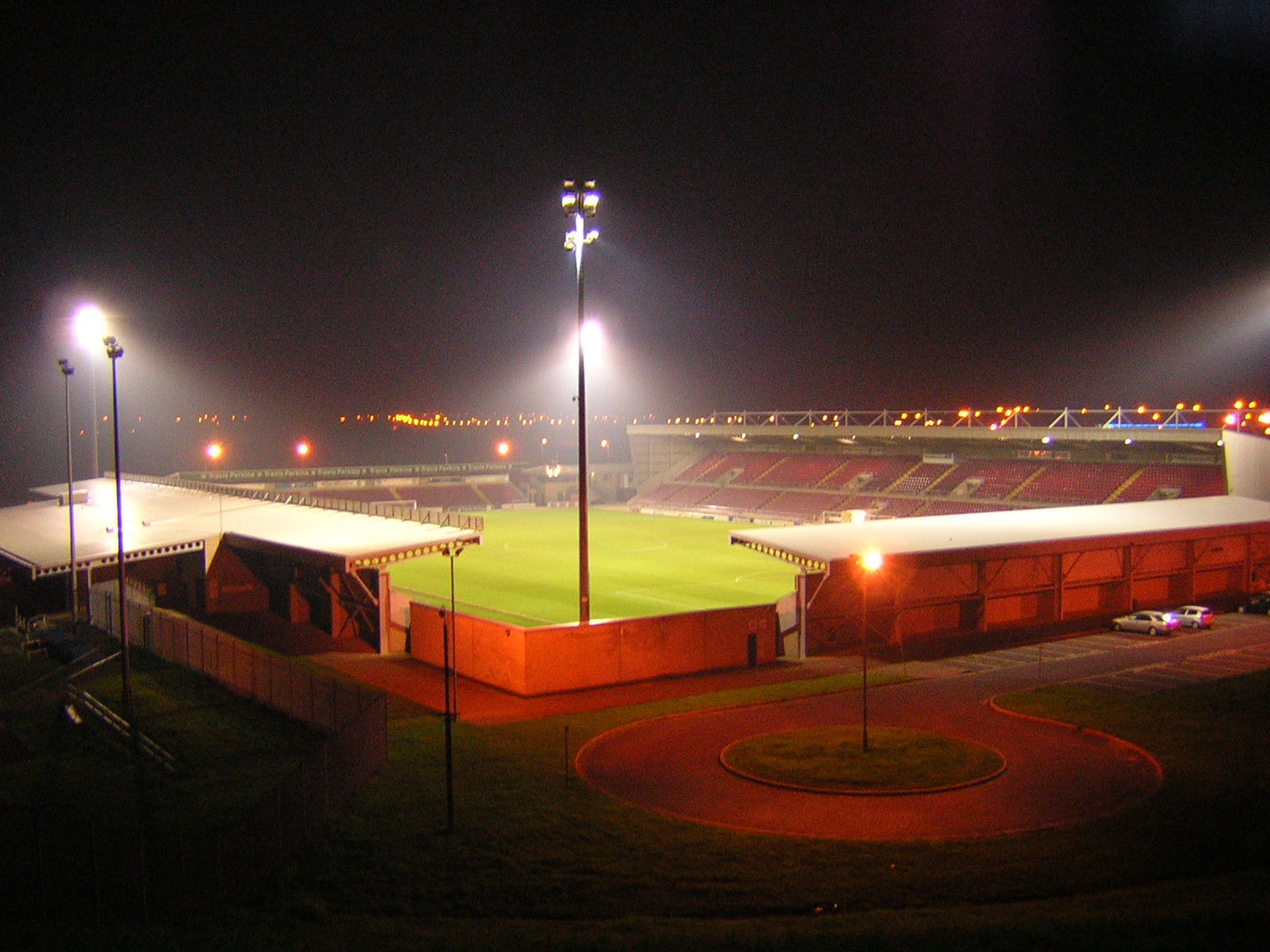
- Interactive map of Sixfields Stadium
- Location: Sixfields, Northampton, England
- Owner: Northampton Town F.C.
- Capacity: 8,203
- Surface: Grass
- Record attendance: 8,029 (Northampton Town v Luton Town, 25 October 2025)

Construction
- Opened: 15 October 1994
- Expanded: 2014, 2025
- Cost: £6,000,000

Tenants
- Northampton Town (1994–present); Coventry City (2013–2014)

Sixfields Stadium is an 8,203-capacity all-seater sports stadium in the Sixfields area on the west side of Northampton, England. It has been the home ground of Northampton Town Football Club following their move from the County Ground in October 1994. It was also rented by Coventry City between July 2013 and August 2014. Aside from being a sports venue, Sixfields also houses conference facilities.

== History ==
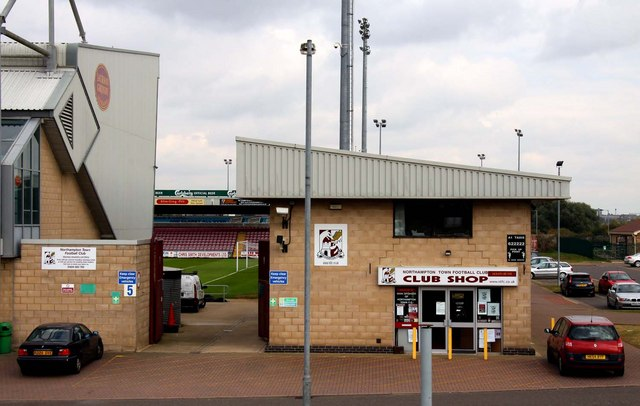
Club shop

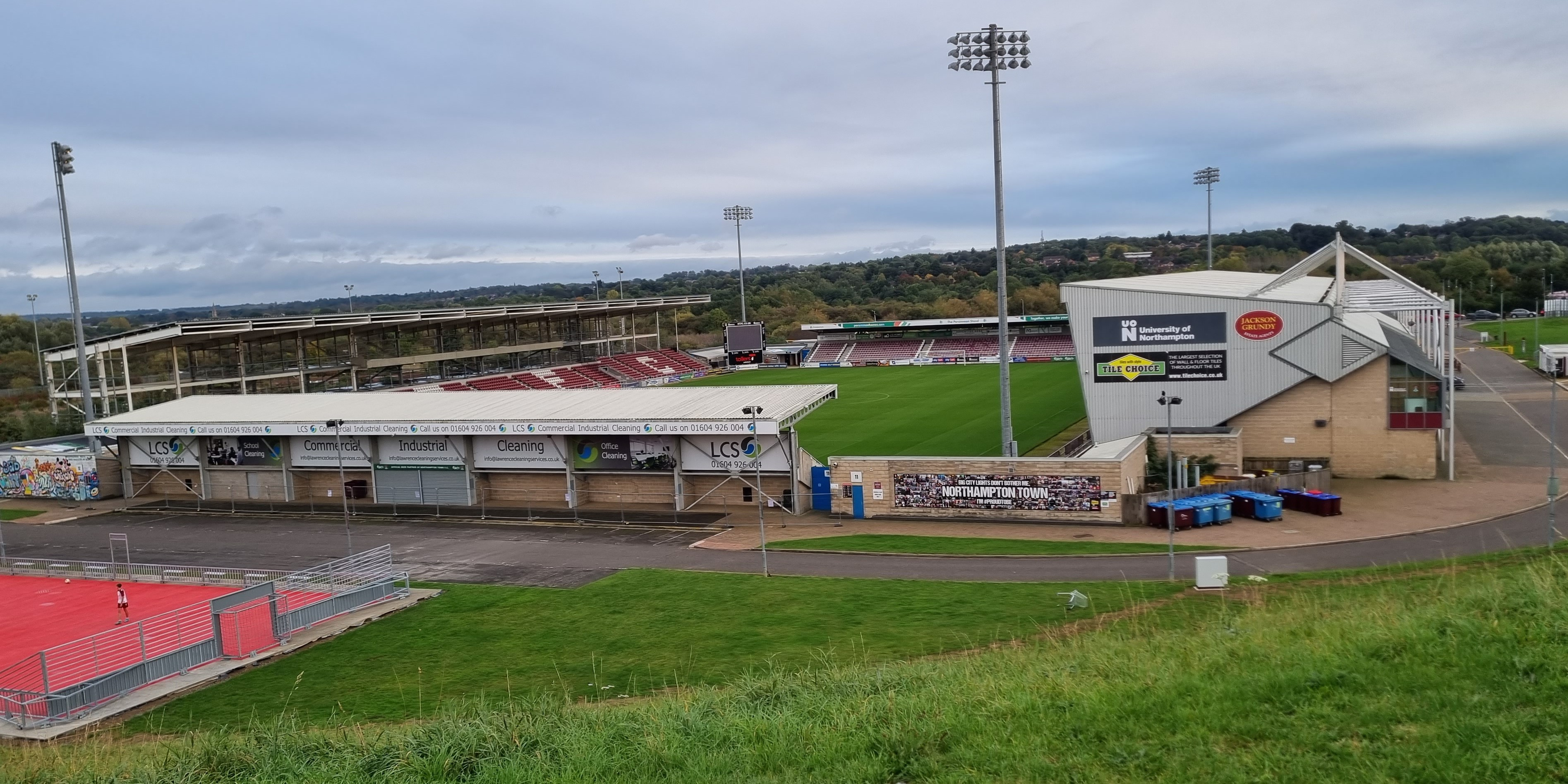
Sixfields Stadium in 2023

Since 1897, Northampton Town had played their home games at the County Cricket Ground, sharing it with Northamptonshire County Cricket Club. Because of the larger size of a cricket pitch, the football ground only had stands on three sides. Northampton Town chose to construct their own stadium, more suitable for football, in the Sixfields area of Northampton.

The stadium had been scheduled to be opened at the start of the 1994–95, but was not ready on time and as a result Northampton began the season still at the County Ground. The first game to be played at Sixfields was against Barnet in Division Three on 15 October 1994. The match ended in a 1–1 draw, with striker Martin Aldridge scoring the first goal at the new stadium.

Because of a rent dispute between the owners of Coventry City and the landlords of their home ground, the Ricoh Arena, Coventry started a groundshare with Northampton in the 2013–14 season. This arrangement was due to continue for three seasons, but in September 2014 Coventry returned to playing at the Ricoh Arena.

== Stands ==
=== Jackson Grundy West Stand ===
The largest of the stands, seating 3,880 home supporters on a match day. The West Stand also accommodates the Weatherbys Boardroom, the LMR Legends Lounge, the Tollers Solicitors 1897 Suite, Carrs Bar, and changing rooms. The tunnel is also there, where the players walk out to the music Liquidator. In 2024 it was renamed the Jackson Grundy Stand due to a sponsorship arrangement with estate agency Jackson Grundy.

=== LCS Dave Bowen Stand ===
Named the LCS Dave Bowen Stand after ex-Northampton Town player and manager Dave Bowen, who helped take the club from Division Four to the First Division during the 1960s, the North Stand is behind the goal nearest to the hill. It seats 972 fans.

=== East Stand ===
The East Stand is the location of the BEES Family Hive and faces the West Stand. It can seat approximately 2,379 fans and is mostly reserved for home supporters. This stand was planned to be built on to increase the capacity to over 8,200 in 2014, but wasn’t completed until 2025. This increased the capacity by 405 from 1,974, with the new overall stadium capacity became 8,203. This expansion brought with it multiple new executive boxes, the first time the club have had these in their 127 year history.

=== Persimmon Homes (South) Stand ===
Standing opposite and identical to LCS Dave Bowen Stand, this end is reserved for away fans. Until the 2015/2016 season the only occasion on which this stand has held Northampton Town supporters was against Chester City on 29 April 2006 when the stand was split and supporters segregated to allow the maximum number of home supporters to witness the club's promotion to League One.

During the 2015–16 season, the stand was split between home and away fans numerous times because of high demand from Northampton Town fans. That was done again in the 3-1 win over Harrogate Town in the 2022-23 promotion winning season.

This stand has a capacity of 972 seats

== Development and fiscal problems ==
=== Vision ===
In December 2003, the football club secured a 150-year lease on the ground from the local council. The then owners of Northampton Town, David and Tony Cardoza, proposed to redevelop the whole ground, doubling capacity into a 15,000 all-seater stadium. This would start by adding executive boxes and a further 2,000 seats to the West Stand, whilst expanding the clubs offices and facilities. The other stands would then be expanded and joined to create a 'bowl' stadium. The new complex would also feature a hotel, coinciding with one of the stands at the County Ground being known as The Hotel End.

The proposed expansion would be largely financed by associated development, such as new shops and the hotel. As these associated developments would not comply with national government policy on restricting out-of-town retail development, the plans for stadium expansion have not progressed to the stage where a formal planning application has been made. In 2009, the Northampton Retail Strategy was produced by consultants CACI for Northampton Borough Council. This study concluded that further out-of-town retail development would harm the existing town centre.

=== East stand development ===
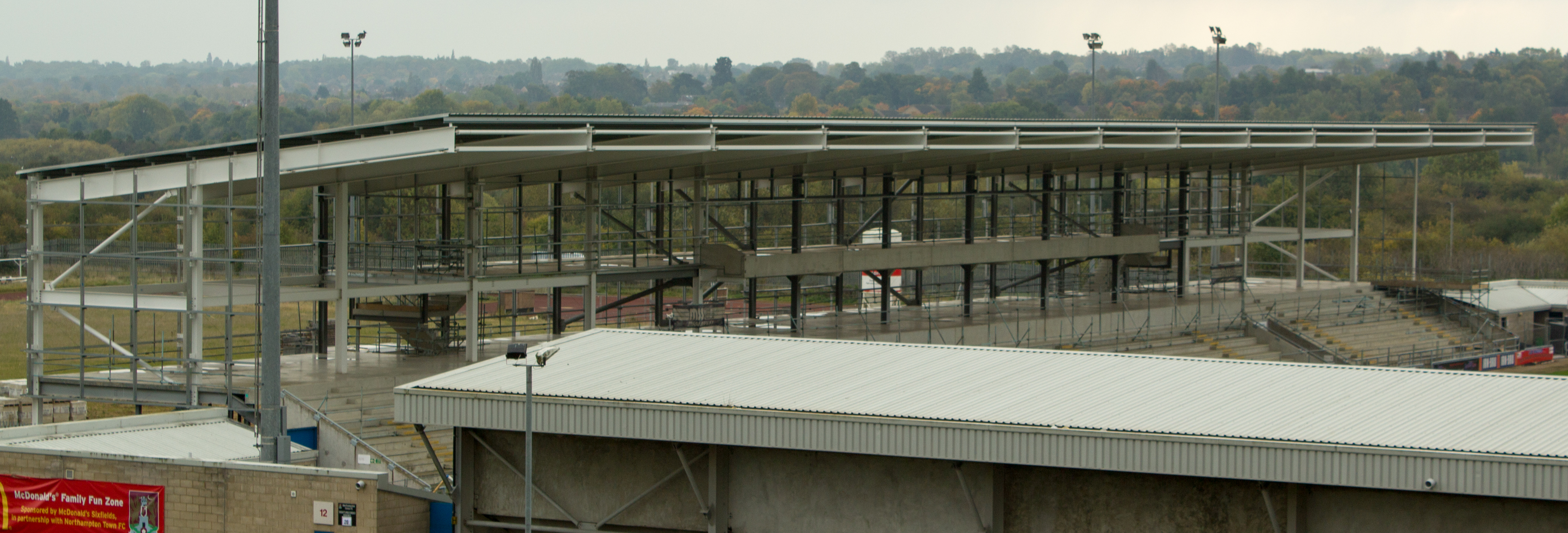
Incomplete East Stand at Sixfields Stadium on 16 October 2015

In 2013, the club proposed redevelopment of the East stand. The project would provide a similar-scale stand to the existing West stand, housing: 4,000 supporters; additional executive facilities; a new family area; plus adding an adjoining hotel and conference centre. Redevelopment began in summer 2014, but in June scaled down plans were revealed, reducing capacity of the stand to about 3,100. Artist's impressions show a similar design to that of Morecambe F.C.'s Globe Arena main stand. Supporters criticised these new designs, as some seats may have a restricted view of play. Currently the stand is only half finished. The stand and associated works were in part funded by a £10.25 million loan from Northampton Borough Council.

=== Financial problems ===
The redevelopment of the East Stand was not completed in time for the opening home match of the 2014–15 League Two season.

In September 2015, with the building work incomplete and two repayments on the loan missed, the borough council issued legal notices to the club requiring that the loan be repaid by 15 October 2015. On 15 October 2015 a winding-up petition was launched by HM Revenue and Customs (HMRC) to recover unpaid taxes from Northampton Town Football Club at the High Court. HMRC claimed to be owed a five-figure sum in unpaid taxes from the club, and said it would take the club to the High Court on 16 November unless payment was received.

The Buckingham Group, which was building the new stand, told the supporters' group on 19 October 2015 that it was owed nearly £3M for work on the stand by May, and hence stopped work in June. On 30 October 2015 it was reported that players and staff at the club had not been paid as the club's bank account was frozen.

In November 2015, administrators' and liquidators' reports emerged for the companies undertaking the development. 1st Land Ltd was a subsidiary of County Group Ltd (also in administration), part of a group owned by businessman Howard Grossman, and had paid monies to associated companies: £1.475m to County Homes (Herts) Ltd; and £233,000 to County Cemetery Services Ltd, directors of which included Howard Grossman, his son Marcus Grossman and Simon Patnick. Further, 1st Land paid £2.65M to Tony and David Cardoza. The liquidators' report for 1st Land Ltd says that the Cardozas and 1st Land fell in dispute in March 2014, and during investigation the Cardozas called the sum a "Joint Venture Fee" – money paid to one party to help carry out a jointly-run project – whilst former director Howard Grossman called it a loan. After the collapse of 1st Land, County Developments (Northampton) Ltd (CDNL) took over the facilitation work, but it also now in liquidation; its directors are listed as David and Anthony Cardoza, while Marcus Grossman and Simon Patnick resigned directorships in January 2015.

On 7 November 2015 The Guardian newspaper published a summary of the Sixfields issue under the headline Northampton Town: scandal of missing millions from council's stadium plan – Cobblers supporters baffled and distressed as council seeks answers about what happened to £10.25m loan to pay for improvements to Sixfields stadium.

=== March 2016 ===
The club's new owners announced that seats would be put into the East Stand, which would take the capacity up to 7,724 for the final few home games of the 2015–16 season. It would form part of phase one while phase two would be completed during the off-season. The first phase would be completed by the start of April 2016. It was announced on 31 March 2016 that the stand would be open on 2 April for the game against Notts County.

=== The PTS Academy Stadium ===
The stadium was renamed the PTS Academy Stadium in June 2018 after the club agreed a naming rights partnership with local training provider PTS Training Academy. In June 2020, the club confirmed that the Stadium would return to the original name, Sixfields Stadium, from 1 July 2021.

=== April 2024 ===
In April 2024, it was announced that the east stand would be finished by the first quarter of 2025. Images were released and the stadium is planned to expand to a capacity of 8,203. The stand was officially opened on 15 March 2025 with a record attendance of 7,947 for Sixfields Stadium
