= Lavendon Abbey =

Premonstratensian abbey in Buckinghamshire, England

Coordinates: 52.173°N 0.684°W

Lavendon Abbey was a Premonstratensian abbey near Lavendon in Buckinghamshire, England.

The abbey was established by John de Bidun between 1154 and 1158 and dedicated to John the Baptist. Bidun's donations to the abbey, together with those of Sibyl de Aungerville, Ranulf Earl of Chester, Ralf de Bray and Richard de Beauchamp, were confirmed by Henry III in 1227. At this point the abbey's possessions included the churches of Lavendon and Lathbury in Buckinghamshire, Wootton in Northamptonshire, Shelton in Bedfordshire and Stow Bedon, Kirby Bedon and Thompson in Norfolk. However, a succession of unsuccessful legal actions caused the abbey to lose control of all but Lavendon and Lathbury, though they later acquired the churches of Brayfield, Ashton and Shotteswell.

The abbey was suppressed in 1536, as part of the first phase of the Dissolution of the Monasteries. At this point the inhabitants comprised 11 canons (9 priests and 2 novices) and 20 servants; its revenues were estimated at £79 13s 8d (equivalent to £58,923 in 2023). The last Abbot, William Gales, was granted a pension of £12 (equivalent to £8,874 in 2023).

Nothing is visible above ground of the original buildings of the abbey, but the surrounding earthworks, field system and the remains of two fish ponds are a scheduled monument.
