= Wothorpe Priory =

Monastic house in Northamptonshire, England

Wothorpe Priory was a monastic house in Northamptonshire, England but adjacent to Stamford, Lincolnshire. It was a "small Benedictine nunnery", founded apparently around 1160. All but one of the nuns died in the outbreak of plague in 1349, with the survivor becoming part of the Priory of Stamford. The property was dissolved by Henry VIII, being granted to Richard Cecil.
