= Knighting sword =

Sword used by a monarch to knight someone

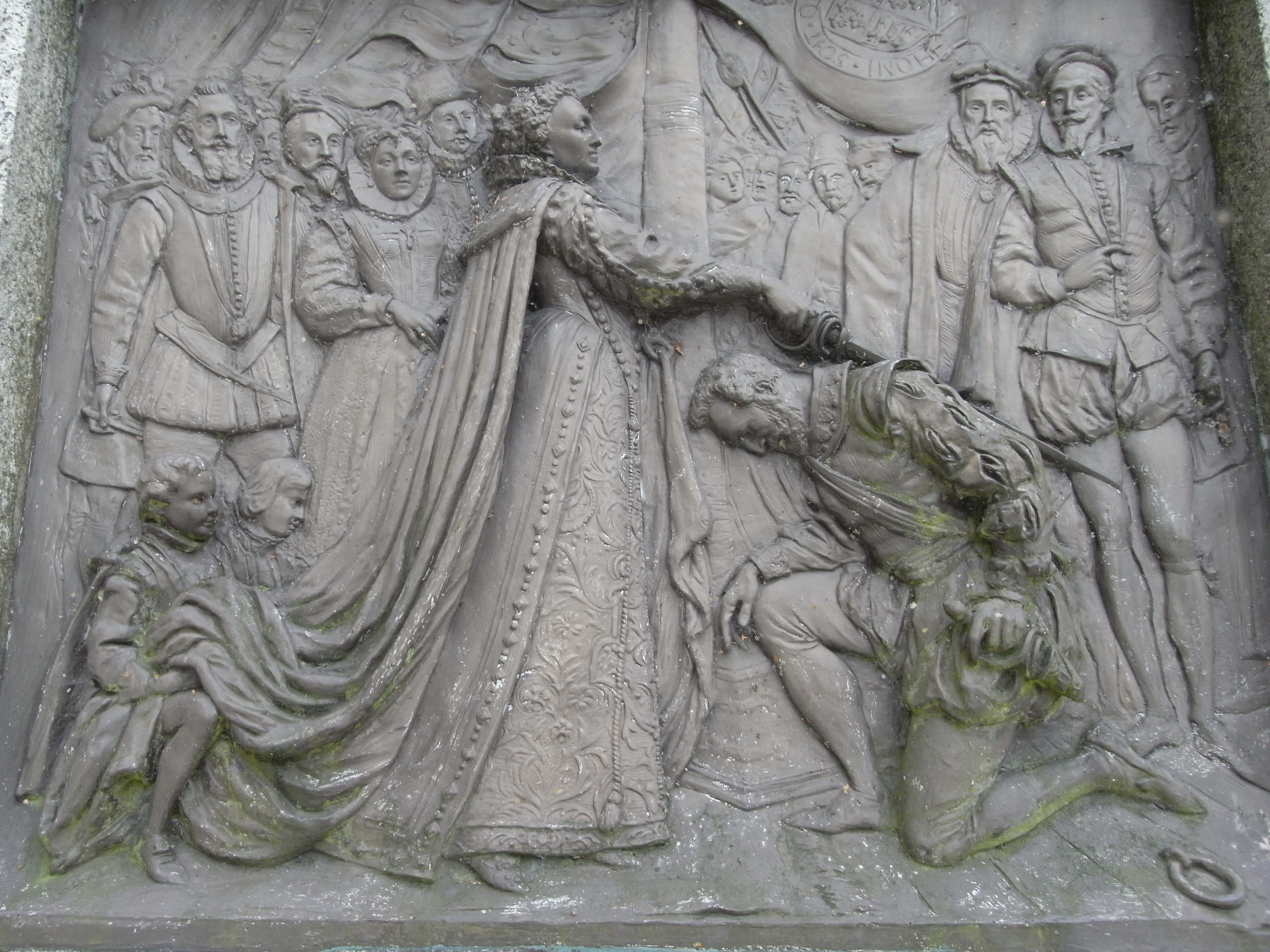
Queen Elizabeth using a knighting sword to knight Sir Francis Drake, stone relief sculpture, 19th century

A knighting sword is a sword used by a monarch during an investiture ceremony in which a person is given an accolade and becomes a knight.

The knighting sword used by the British monarch Queen Elizabeth II was the sword she inherited from her father, George VI, from when he was Duke of York and colonel of the Scots Guard.
