= Accolade =

Central act in the rite of passage ceremonies conferring knighthood

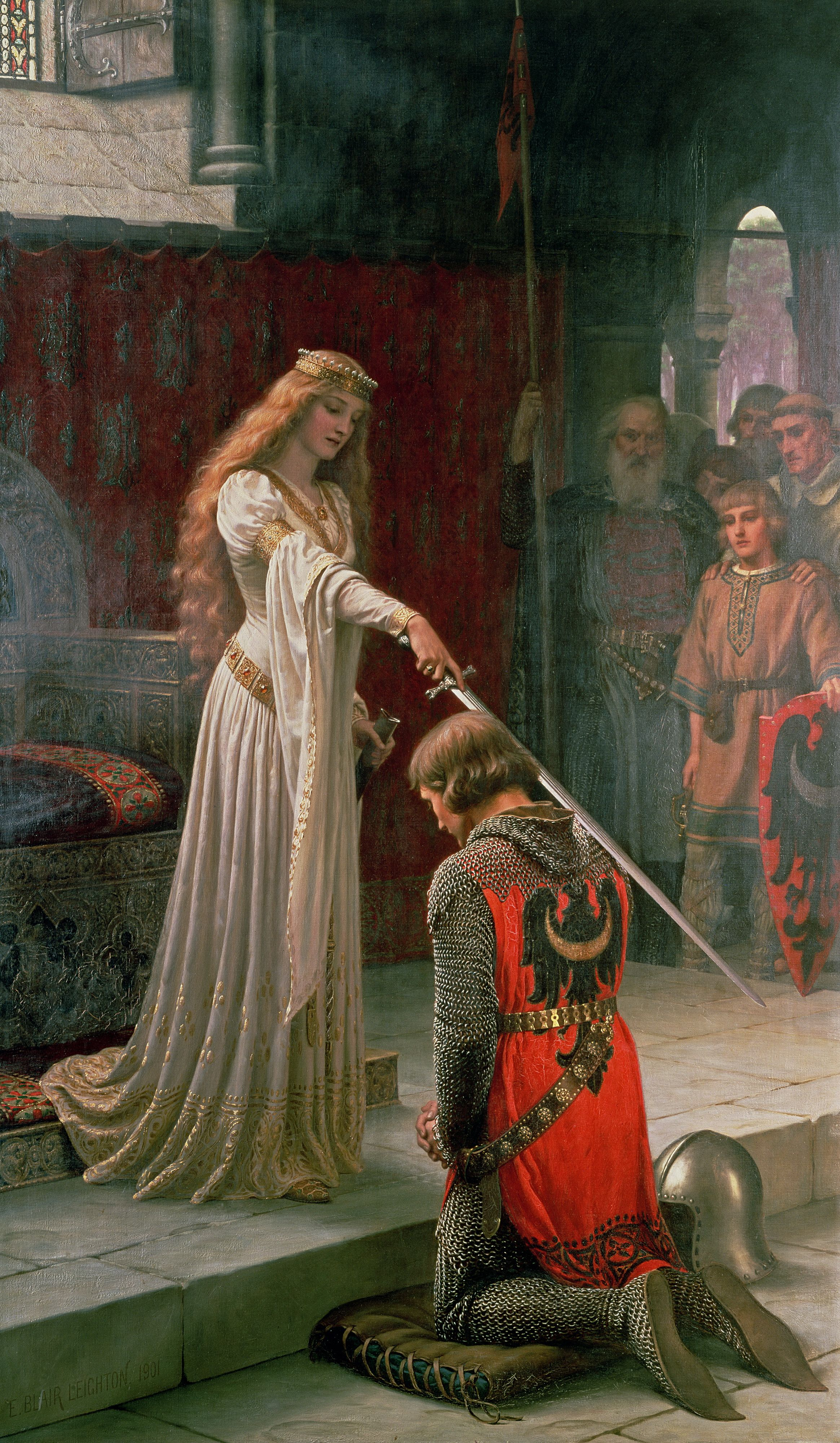
The Accolade (1901), by Edmund Leighton

The accolade (also known as dubbing, adoubement, or knighting) (Latin: benedictio militis) was the central act in the rite of passage ceremonies conferring knighthood in the Middle Ages.

== Etymology ==
The term accolade entered English by 1591, when Thomas Lodge used it in a historical romance about Robert the Devil: "He had with all solemnitie the accolade, and was commanded to kneele downe to receiue the order of Knighthoode". It derives from the Middle French accolee, meaning an embrace or the bestowal of knighthood thereby, which in turn descends from the Latin collum, meaning "neck".

Regarding the cognate term colée/collée, see below.

== History ==
=== Ceremony ===
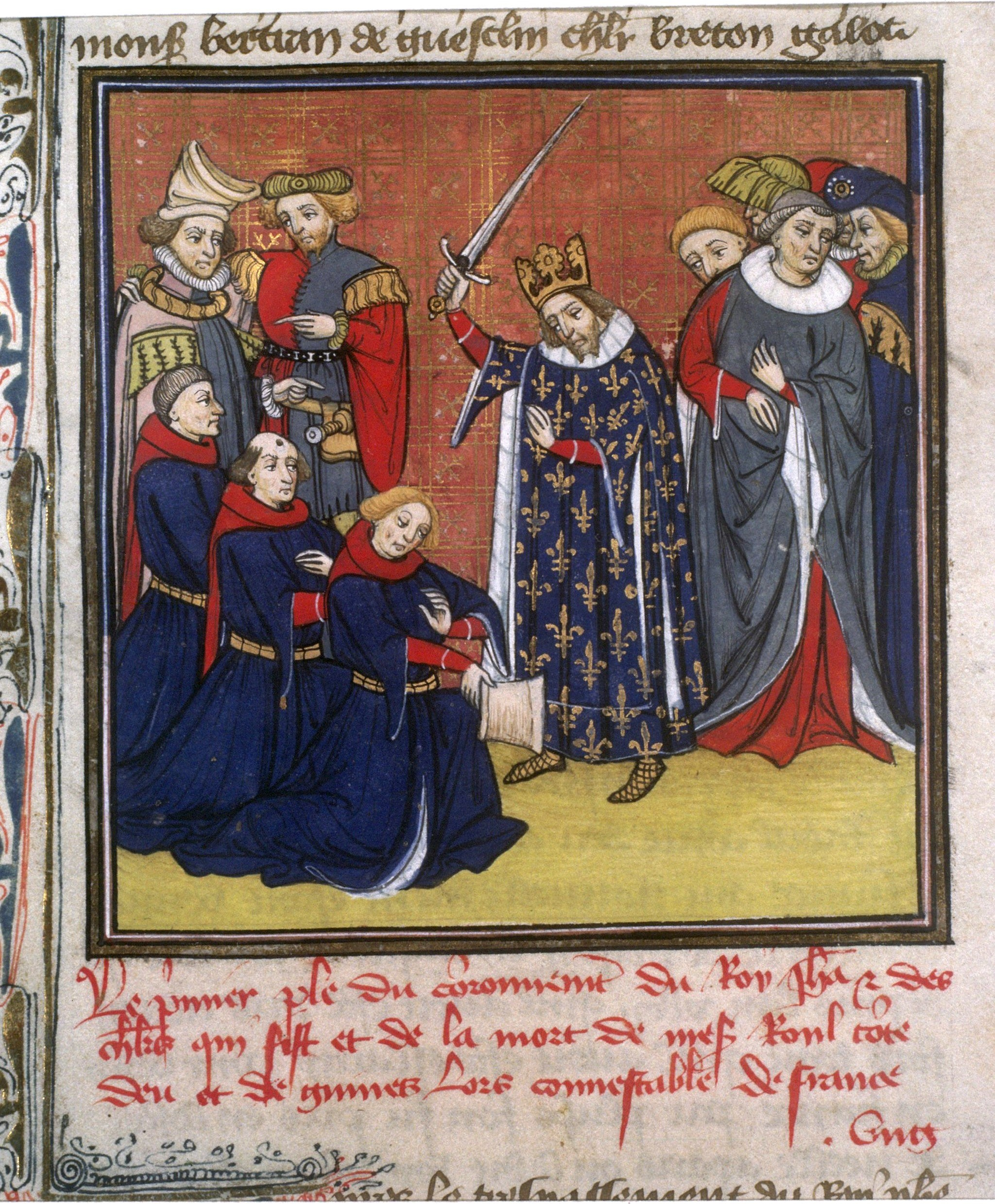
King John II of France in a ceremony of "adoubement", early 15th century miniature

In earlier medieval times, knighting did not involve any ritual of the "hand-buffet on the neck" or the accolade by sword-tap of later times. It only involved the equipping of one with the arms of a full-fledged man, and the ritual was one of girding the knight candidate with his sword.

The ceremony typically involved the knight candidate being girt with a sword or having (golden) spurs attached onto him. (Note: Daniel, Gabriel (1721) [1713]. Histoire de la Milice François, i. 99-104 apud EB1911)

As precursor of the accolade, there was the rite of colée/collée in parts of medieval France, which involved a rough blow to the neck of the one being bestowed knighthood. Possibly by the intervention of the Church, the practice was mitigated to delivering a light blow with the sword, and eventually the modern term accolade stuck to it. (Note: Some authorities state the meaning of accolade is debated, and could refer to either a blow or embrace, or a tap with the sword.)

Accolade ceremonies have taken a variety of forms, including the tapping of the flat side of a knighting sword on the shoulders of a candidate (who is himself sometimes referred to as an accolade during the ceremony) or an embrace about the neck.

The earliest reference to the knighting as a formal ceremony in Germany is in the Annals of Aachen under the year 1184, when the Emperor Frederick I's sons, Henry VI and Frederick VI, "were made knights" (facti sunt milites).

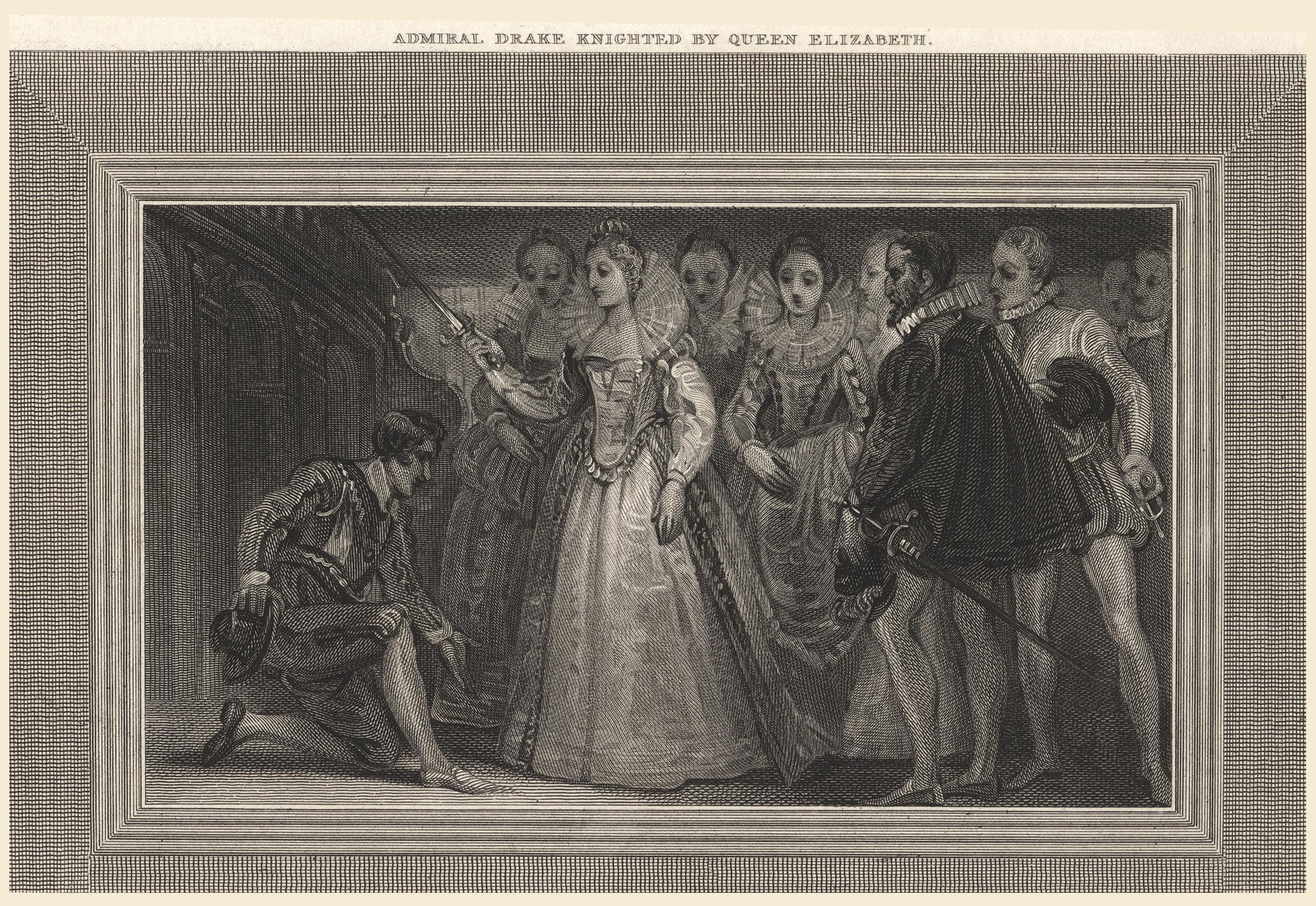
Francis Drake (left) being knighted by Queen Elizabeth I in 1581. The recipient is tapped on each shoulder with a sword. Note that in reality, Elizabeth had the French ambassador perform the ceremony instead.

An early Germanic coming-of-age ceremony, of presenting a youth with a weapon that was buckled on him, was elaborated in the 10th and 11th centuries as a sign that the minor had come of age. A panel in the Bayeux Tapestry shows the knighting of Harold by William of Normandy, but the specific gesture is not clearly represented.

In medieval France, early ceremonies of the adoubement were purely secular and indicated a young noble coming of age. Around 1200, these ceremonies began to include elements of Christian ritual (such as a night spent in prayers, prior to the rite).

The increasingly impressive ceremonies surrounding adoubement figured largely in the Romance literature, both in French and in Middle English, particularly those set in the Trojan War or around the legendary personage of Alexander the Great.

== Accolade in the 21st century ==
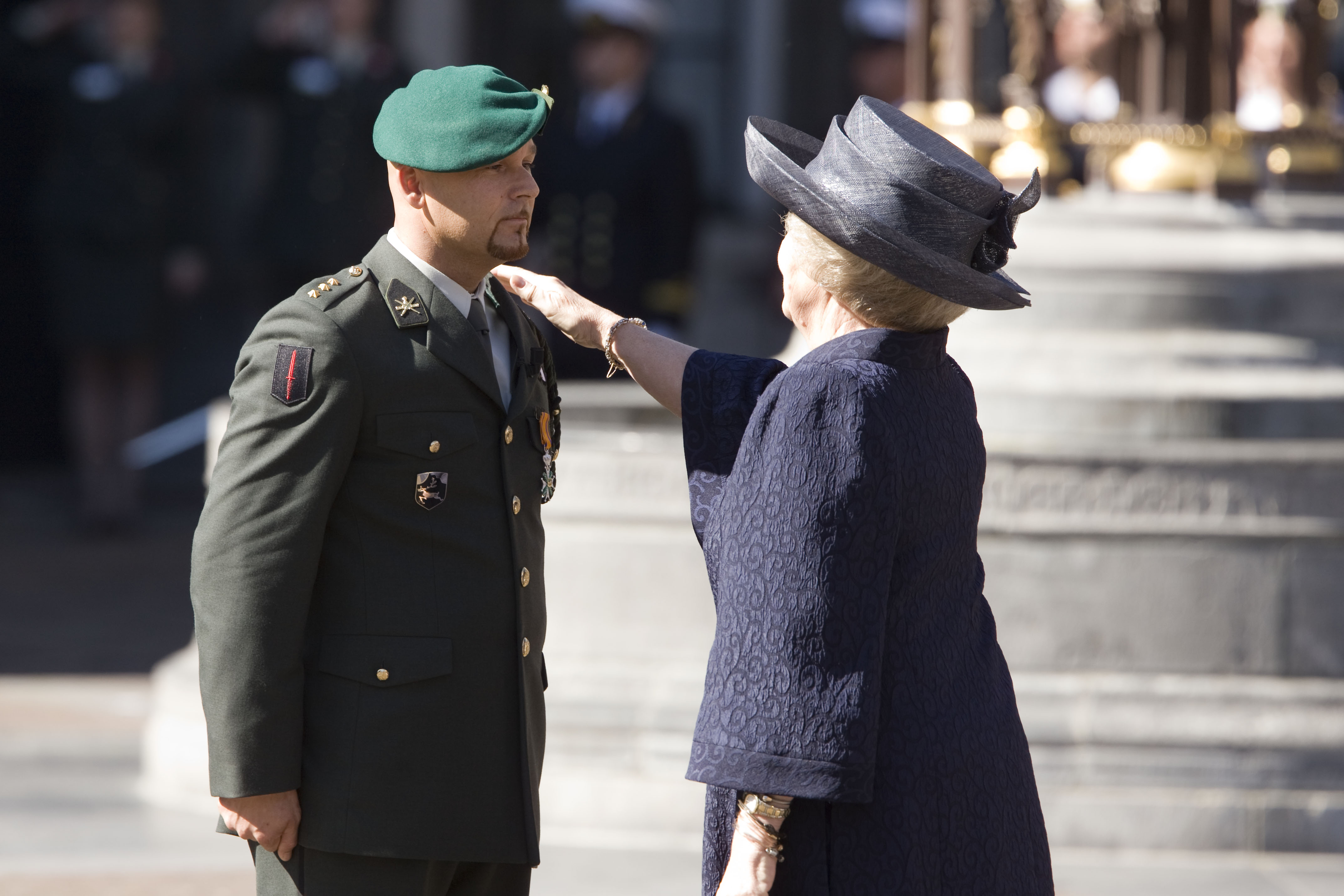
Accolade performed by Queen Beatrix of the Netherlands during the Military Order of William ceremony of Marco Kroon in 2009

=== France ===
Newly inducted military Knights of the Legion of Honour are struck on both shoulders with a sword (Army and Navy) or a dirk (Air Force), if the ceremony is presided over by a military authority. Civilian members and all members of lesser orders (Merit, Arts and Letters...) are not dubbed with a bladed weapon. They receive only the accolade, which has kept in French its ancient meaning of "embrace".

Officers in the French Armed Forces also receive the accolade, but a different version. When they graduate, during the ceremony a senior officer hovers their sword on the kneeling graduate's shoulders as if he were knighting the young officer. This part is called the "adoubement", which has a different meaning than accolade. Adoubement involves the sword, accolade is a movement of the hands which varies in different countries. In France, it can be akin to a hug or a hand on the shoulder.

=== Netherlands ===
In the Netherlands, the knights in the exclusive Military Order of William (the Dutch "Victoria Cross") are struck on the left shoulder with the palm of the hand, first by the Dutch monarch (if present) then by the other knights. The new knight does not kneel.

=== United Kingdom ===
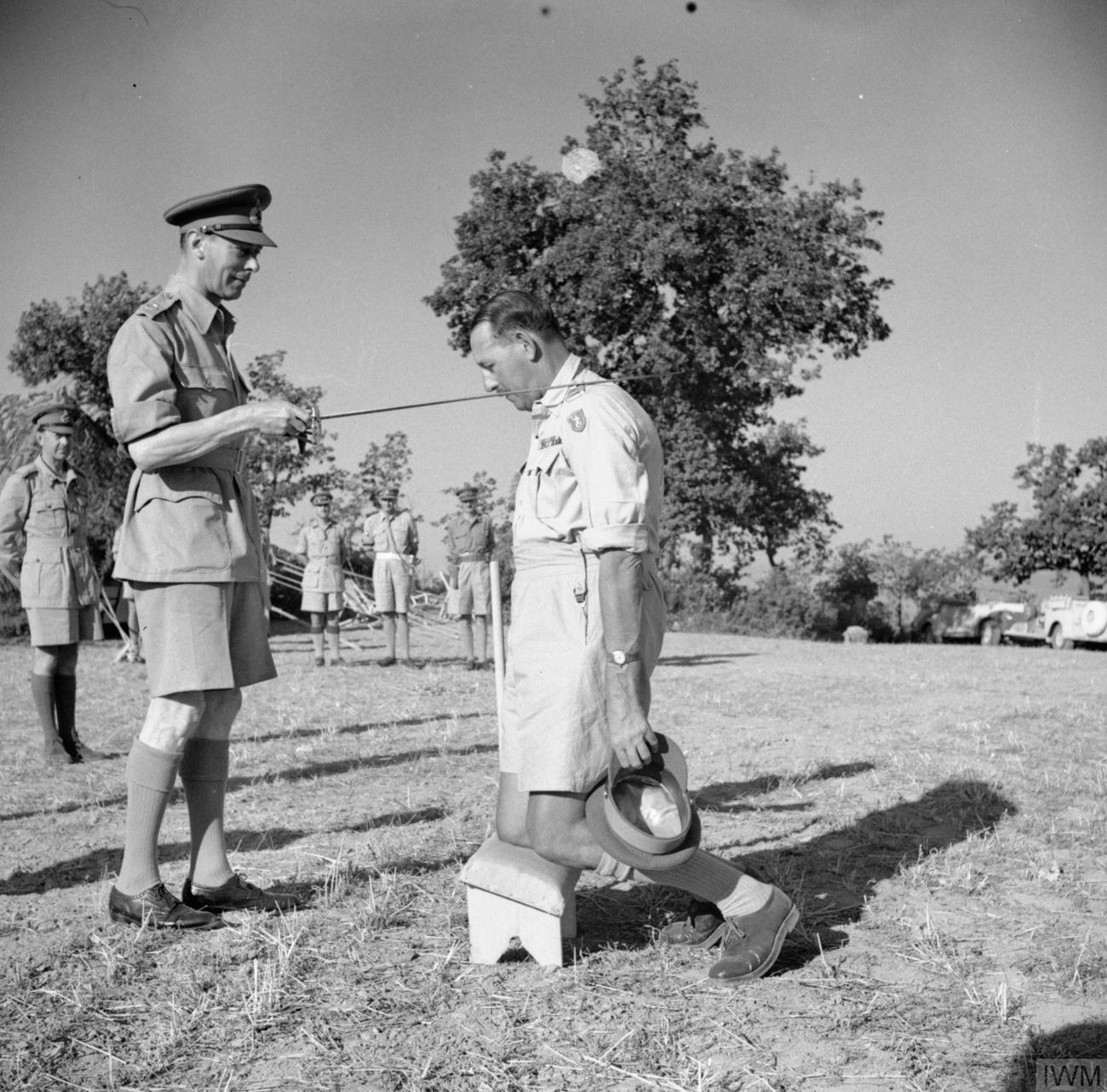
King George VI knights General Oliver Leese in a field in Italy in 1944.

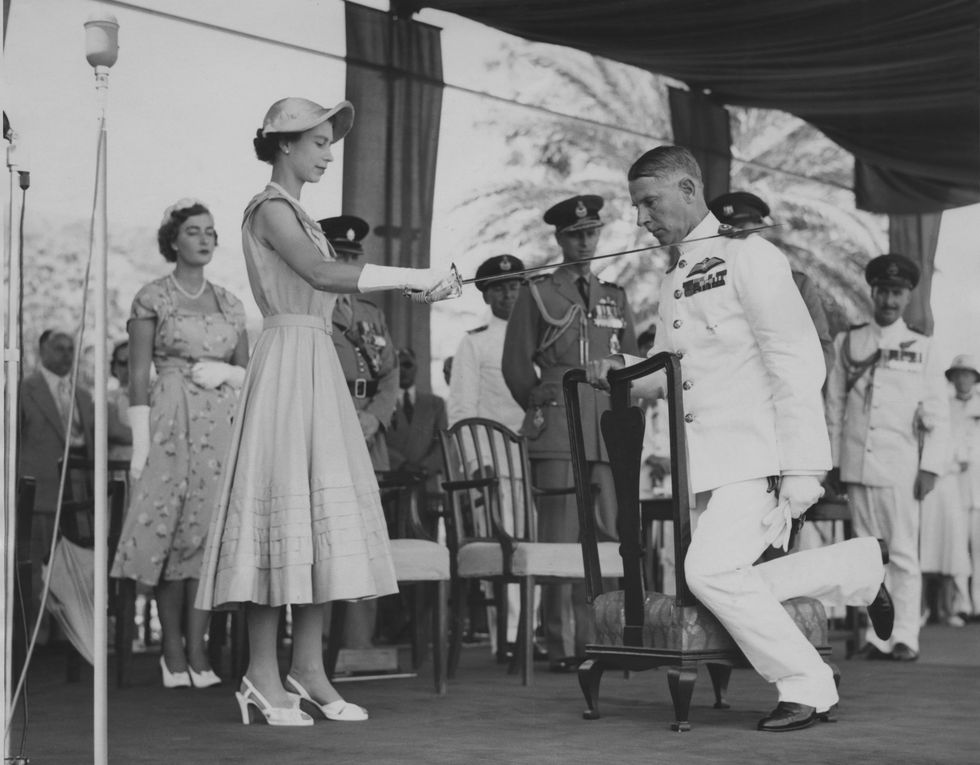
Queen Elizabeth II knights Claude Pelly as part of her 1954 visit to Aden Colony.

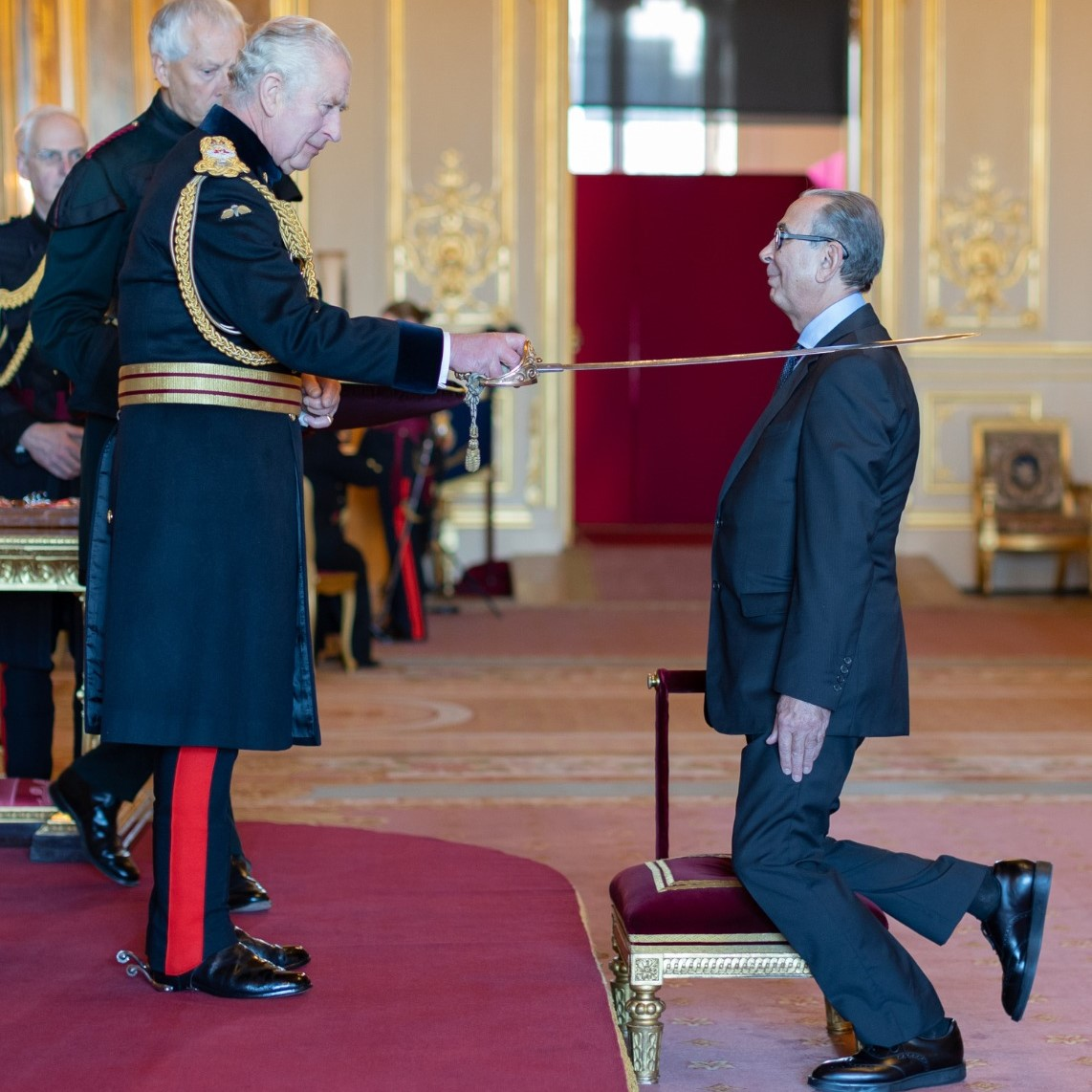
King Charles III knights Nasser Khalili in 2022.

All newly created knights in the UK are dubbed on both shoulders with a sword by the monarch or the prince delegated by them. In the first example, the "knight-elect" kneels in front of the monarch on a knighting-stool. First, the monarch lays the side of the sword's blade onto the accolade's right shoulder. The monarch then raises the sword just up over the apprentice's head, flips it counterclockwise so that the same side of the blade will come in contact with the knight's body, and places it on his left shoulder. The new knight then stands up, and the king or queen presents him with the insignia of his new order. Contrary to popular belief, the phrase "Arise, Sir ..." is not used. There are currently eleven different knighthoods being bestowed (in ascending order): Knights Bachelor, Knights Commanders and Knights Grand Cross of the Order of the British Empire, Royal Victorian Order, Order of Saint Michael and Saint George and Order of the Bath, Knights of the Order of the Thistle and Knights Companion of the Order of the Garter.

Women who are awarded damehoods do not receive the accolade.

Clergy receiving a knighthood are not dubbed. The use of a sword in this kind of a ceremony is believed to be inappropriate.

=== Vatican ===
Knights of the Equestrian Order of the Holy Sepulchre of Jerusalem, an order of chivalry under the protection of the Holy See, are dubbed with a bishop's crozier or crucifix during the investiture ceremony. The accolade is often followed by Holy Mass, celebrated by the officiating Prelate.

=== Central Europe ===
The accolade is also performed today with the unrecognized Habsburg Order of St. George during the investiture with a sword on both shoulders. The ceremony including the oath is performed by Karl von Habsburg or Georg von Habsburg. The knights kneel and the sword touches both shoulders.

== See also ==
- Feudalism
- Vigil
