= Annals of Aachen =

1169 collection of Latin annals

The Annals of Aachen (Latin: Annales Aquenses) is an anonymous late 12th-century compilation of Latin annals from St Mary's Church in Aachen. The annals were originally compiled in 1169 and subsequently extended down to 1196. The first part is little more than a list of Roman emperors from AD 1 until 684. Entries for the years 688–809 were borrowed from some Carolingian imperial annals and are closely related to the Annals of Saint-Amand. There follows a list of Carolingian and German rulers down to 1109. The reports on the reign of Henry V (1105–1125) are generally positive. The coverage of the Staufer rulers is also positive.

The Annals of Aachen contain the earliest example in Germany of the expression "to make a knight". It occurs in the account of the knighting of Frederick I's sons, Henry VI and Frederick VI in 1184: facti sunt milites, they were made knights. This is one of the earliest pieces of evidence for a ceremony of knighting in Germany.

== Editions ==
- Georg Waitz (ed.), "Annales Aquenses", in MGH Scriptores, 24 (1879), pp. 33–39.
