= Enclosed helmet =

Type of helmet of the late 12th and early 13th century

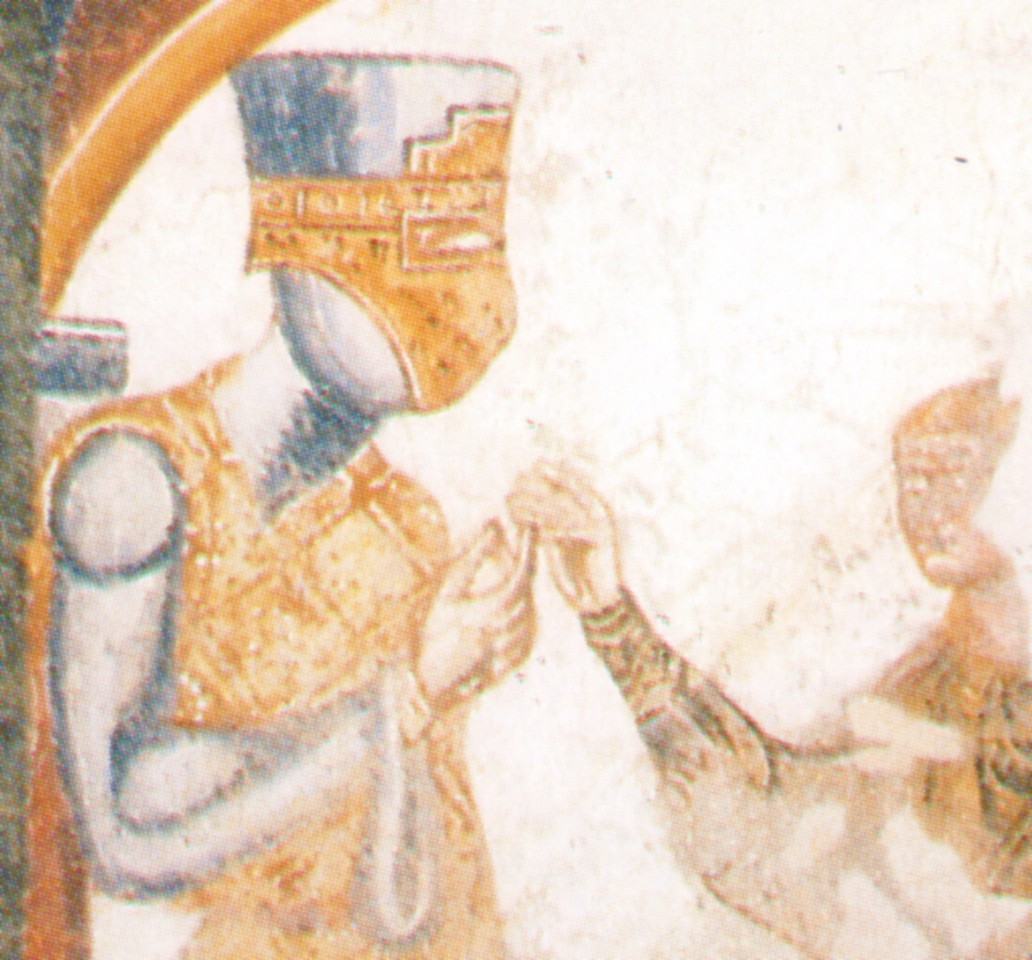
Man in armour wearing a very well depicted enclosed helmet. 13th-century fresco showing a scene from "Iwein" by Hartmann von Aue in Rodenegg Castle, South Tyrol, Italy

The enclosed helmet, also termed a primitive great helm or early great helm, was a type of Western European helmet of the late 12th and early 13th century. It was the forerunner of the great helm.

== Development and characteristics ==
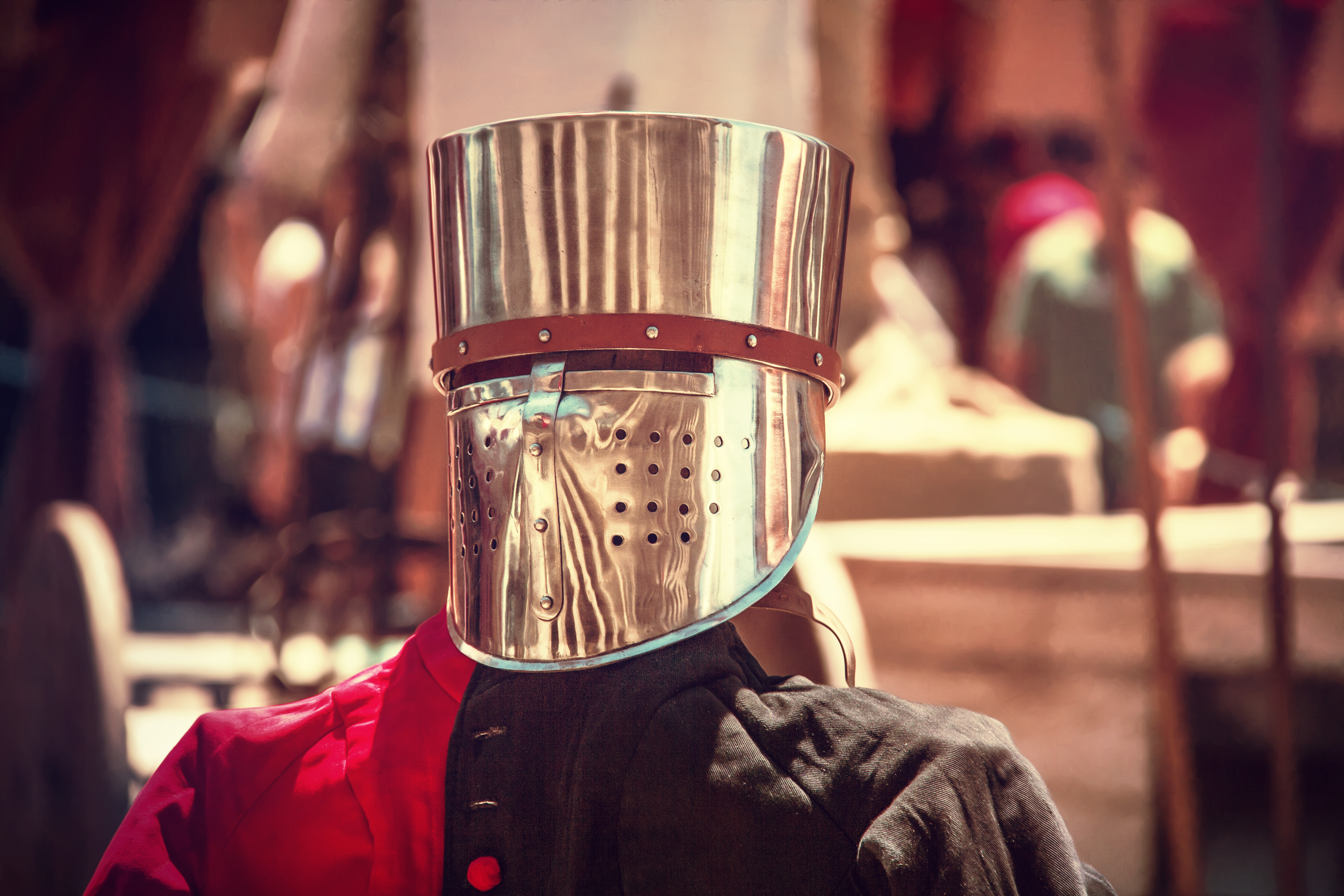
Modern replica enclosed helmet

The enclosed helmet covered the majority of the head, with full protection for the face and somewhat deeper coverage for the sides and back of the head than that found on previous types of helmets. It was developed in the very late 12th century and was largely superseded by the true great helm by c. 1240. It is distinguishable from the great helm by a much greater depth to the face protection when compared to the depth of the helmet at the rear and sides.

It probably evolved from the nasal helmet, which had been produced in a flat-topped variant with a square profile by about 1180. The enclosed helmet was created by adding a face-protecting plate, pierced for sight and breathing, and by extending downwards the back and sides of a flat-topped helmet, to produce a cylindrical helm. From the evidence of extant contemporary illustrations the face protection was added first, probably as an extension of the pre-existing nasal. Some German illustrations dating to around 1180 show a bar at the end of the nasal covering the mouth, if such a bar had been extended and curved back to the brow of the helmet, a forerunner of a full face-plate would have been created.

One of the earliest illustrations of a fully developed example of this type of helmet, with the addition of a fan-shaped crest, is depicted on the second Great Seal of Richard I of England dating to 1198.

== Use ==
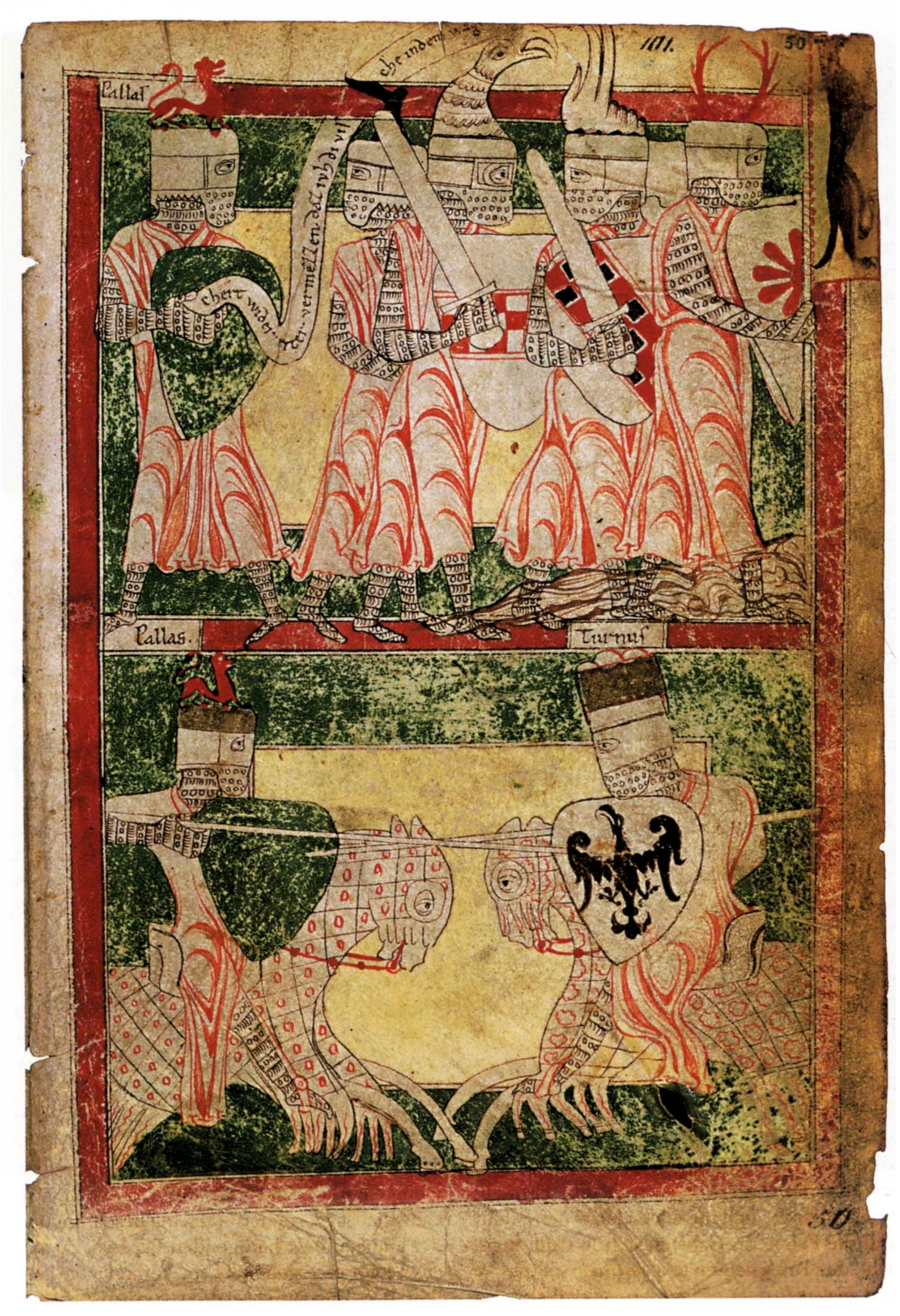
Knights wearing enclosed helmets. German manuscript of Heinrich von Veldeke's Eneasroman, c. 1215.

The enclosed helmet would have been worn over a mail coif, with additional padding circling the head to cushion the helmet and help absorb the force of any blow. The helmet may have arisen from a need for greater facial protection in response to the penetrating power of couched lances used in the closely packed "conrois" formation, or possibly as a response to an increased threat from archery. The enclosed helmet was only used by men of knightly rank. Many soldiers, including knights, disliked the restriction to sight and hearing imposed by the enclosed helmet, and therefore the more open round-topped and flat-topped nasal helmets, plus 'kettle hats', continued in use alongside it into the mid 13th century.

== Bibliography ==
- Gillingham, John (1978). Richard the Lionheart. London: Weidenfeld & Nicolson. ISBN 0-297-77453-0.
- Gravett, Christopher (1993) Norman Knight 950-1204 AD, Osprey, London.
- Nicolle, David, (1988) The Crusades, Osprey, London.
- Nicolle, David, (1996) Knight of Outremer 1187-1344 AD, Osprey, London.
