= Frog-mouth helm =

Type of European helm

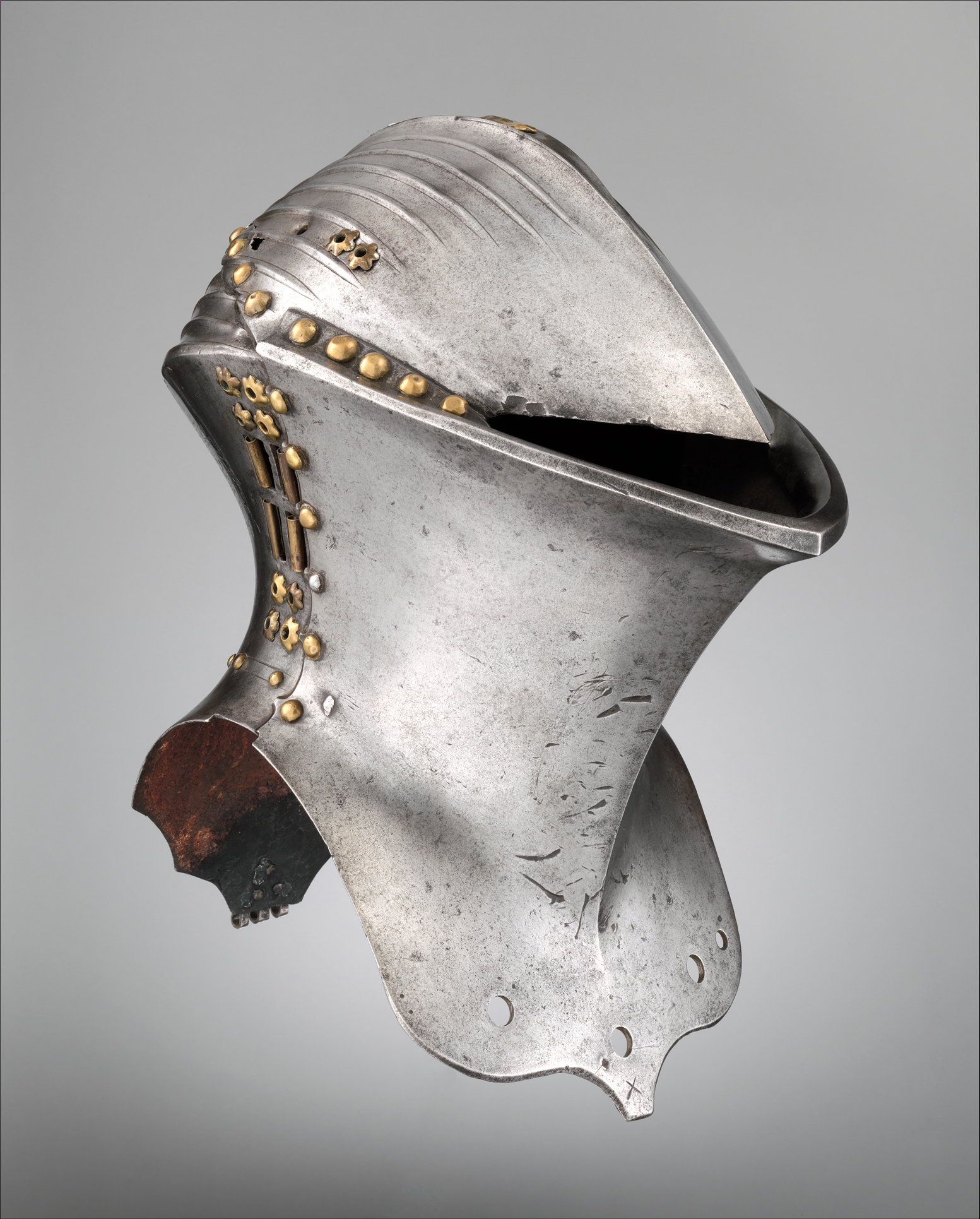
German stechhelm, c. 1500

The frog-mouth helm (or Stechhelm, German for "jousting helmet", to stechen, "to thrust", lit. 'to stick') was a type of great helm for tournament jousting, designed to maximize protection against lance blows. The sheek plates are large with heavy backwards sloping, going outwards in a concave manner up to the vision slit (ocularium), which then appears as the mouth of a frog. They are traditionally fixed to an upper chest piece to mitigate strain on the user's neck if hit.

Such started appearing from around 1400 and lasting into the first quarter of the 16th century, later retroactively returning for post-medieval jousting practice. The helmet is primarily intended for sport, rather than battlefield use.

During jousting tournaments, the helmet offered a better degree of protection from lances that would splinter after impact with the rival's body armour. Early examples of the stechhelm were made from a single piece of metal, while later dated helmets had hinged constructions that could be disassembled.

== History ==
Appearing in the 15th and 16th century in Germany, the helmet became popular for jousting due to the improved protection of the eyes it offered. Early one-piece examples were later improved with hinged varieties. By the late 15th century, it had become customary for this type of helmet to be mounted with screws or rivets onto the wearer's cuirass, though this only allowed the wearer to look forward, rendering helmets worn that way only suitable for jousting charges.

Later versions had hinges and could be opened in the front for ventilation, while also "folding" around the wearer's head to put on and "unfolding" to be removed. The helm had vents allowing the wearer to breathe more easily whilst using it, as well as allowing otherwise muted noise to reach the ears, thus improving listening of the environment and awareness in general. Underneath the helm, the wearer traditionally had a leather cowl to protect from concussive impacts. The cowl was attached with leather straps and cords fastened to the helmet, so that a certain degree of head movement was guaranteed. A popular jousting technique was, at the last second, to pull the head up. This completely obscured the vision for the wearer, but it protected the eyes from the splinters of the lance as it broke on his armour or shield, with the most probable scenario being the lance shattering anywhere below the neck.
