= Spangenhelm =

European combat helmet design of late Antiquity and the Early Middle Ages

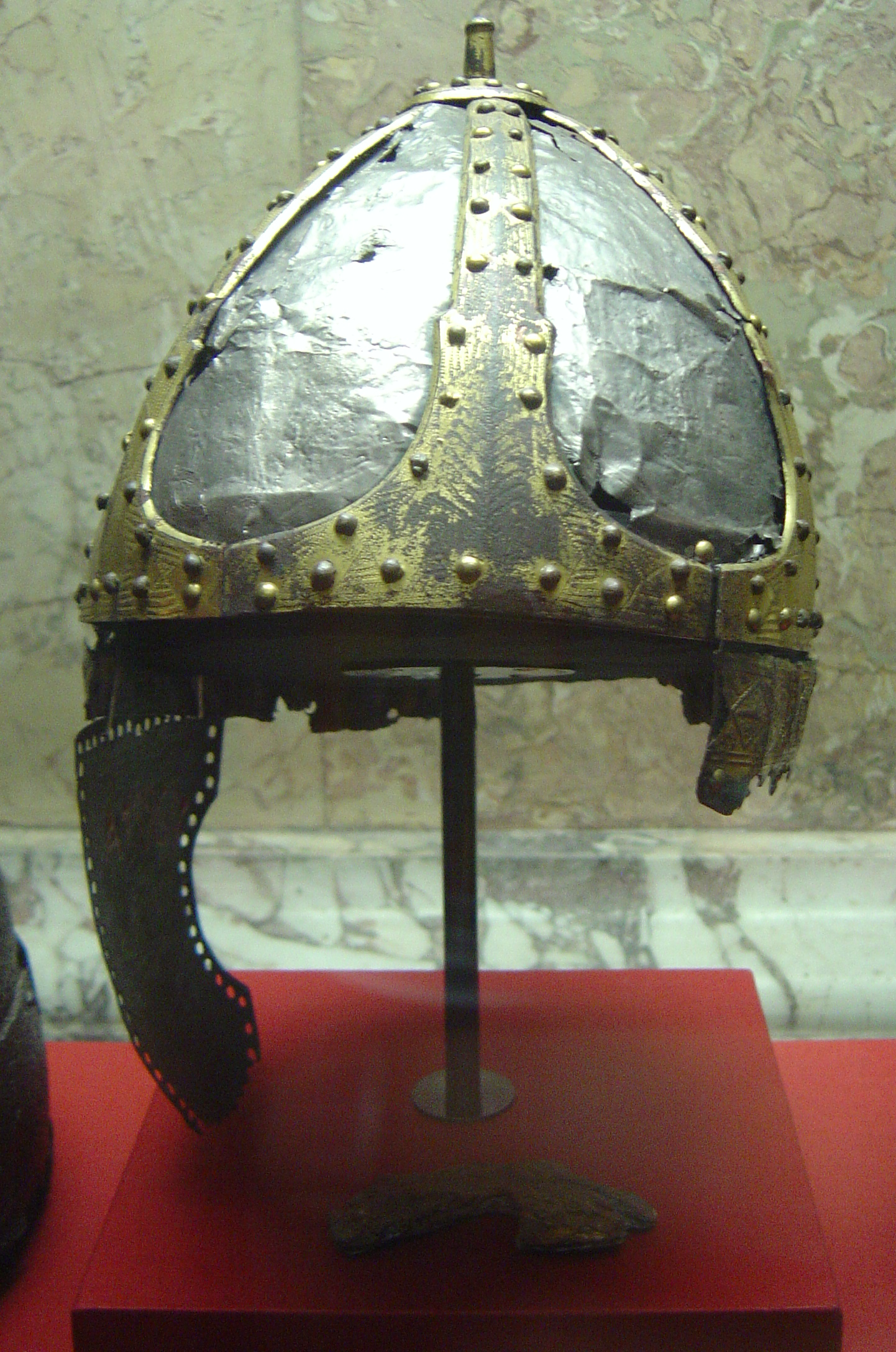
A surviving Spangenhelm, 6th century (Kunsthistorisches Museum, Vienna)

The Spangenhelm, or segmented helmet, was a popular medieval European combat helmet design of Late Antiquity and the Early Middle Ages. They are often contrasted with Eastern lamellar helmets.

== Construction ==
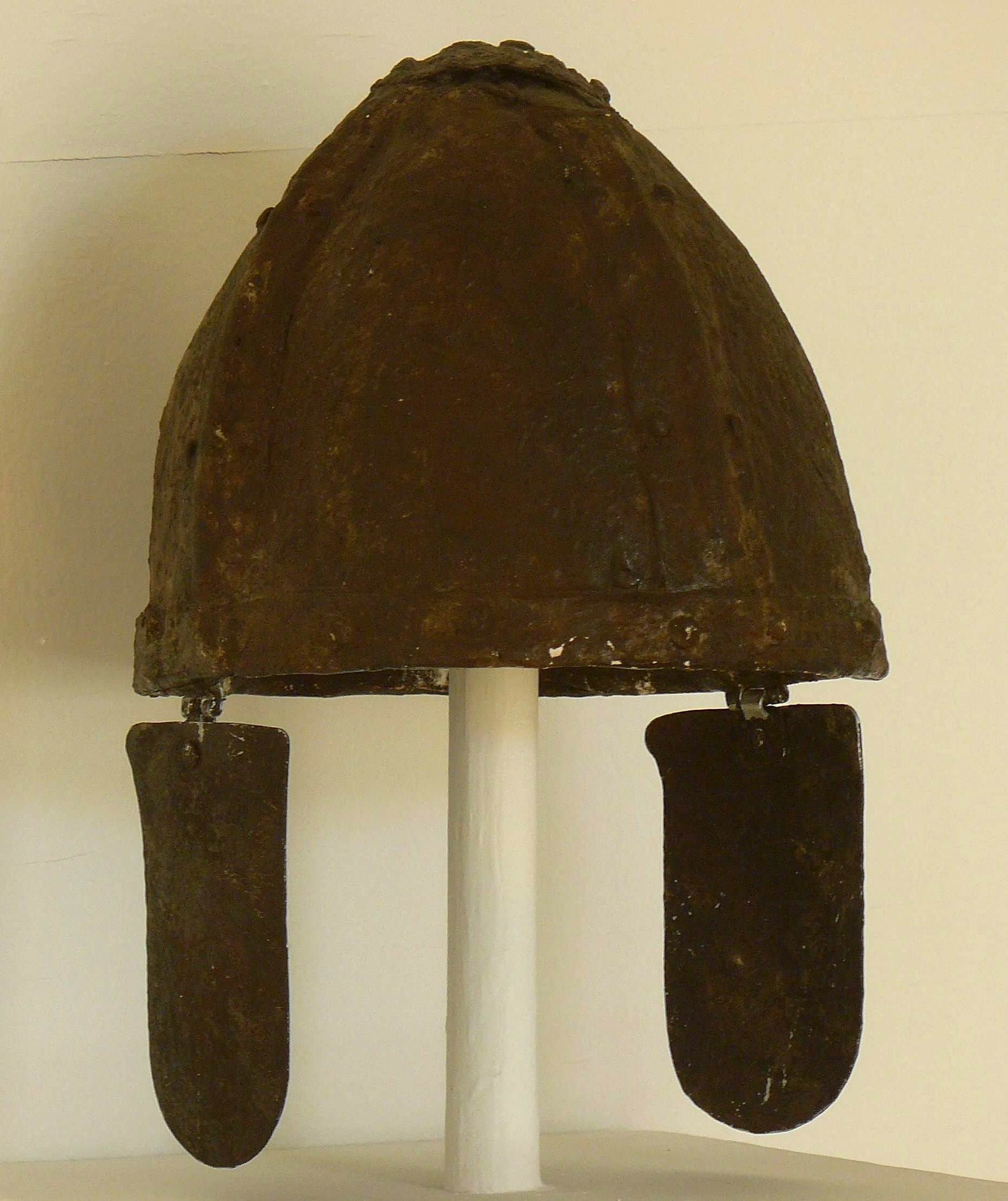
Spangenhelm (iron), Migration Period - Museum of the Cetinska Krajina Region - Sinj, Croatia

The name Spangenhelm is of German origin. Spangen refers to the metal strips that form the framework for the helmet and could be translated as braces, and -helm simply means helmet. The strips connect three to six steel or bronze plates. The frame takes a conical design that curves with the shape of the head and culminates in a point. The front of the helmet may include a nose protector (a nasal). Older spangenhelms often include cheek flaps made from metal or leather. Spangenhelms may incorporate mail as neck protection, thus forming a partial aventail. Some spangenhelms include eye protection in a shape that resembles modern eyeglass frames, and are thus sometimes called "spectacle helmets". Other spangenhelms include a full face mask.

The spangenhelm was an effective protection that was relatively easy to produce. Weakness of the design were its partial head protection and its jointed construction. It was replaced by similarly shaped helmets made with one-piece skulls (nasal helms), kettle hats and eventually the great helm or casque.

== History ==
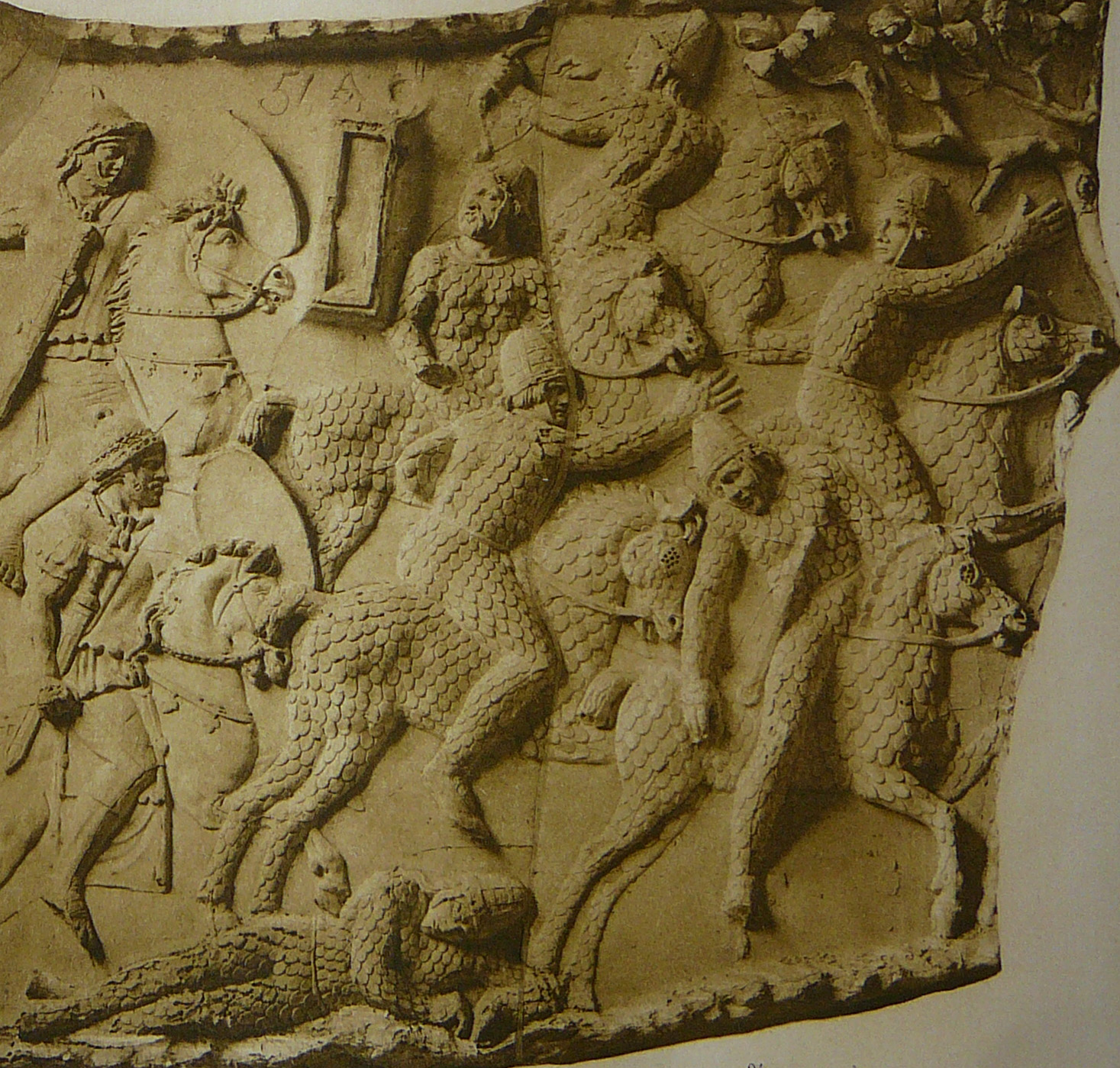
Sarmatian warriors with Spangenhelms, Trajan's Column (around 110 A.D.)

The spangenhelm arrived in Western Europe by way of what is now southern Russia and Ukraine, spread by nomadic Iranian tribes such as the Scythians and Sarmatians who lived among the Eurasian steppes. By the 6th century it was the most common helmet design in Europe and in popular use throughout the Middle East. However, helmets of the spangenhelm type were used much longer. Some of the nasal helmets depicted on the Bayeux Tapestry, such as the one from scene 18, from the 11th century appear to be built as a Spangenhelm construction. The same is true for illustrations of the Morgan Bible from the 13th century.

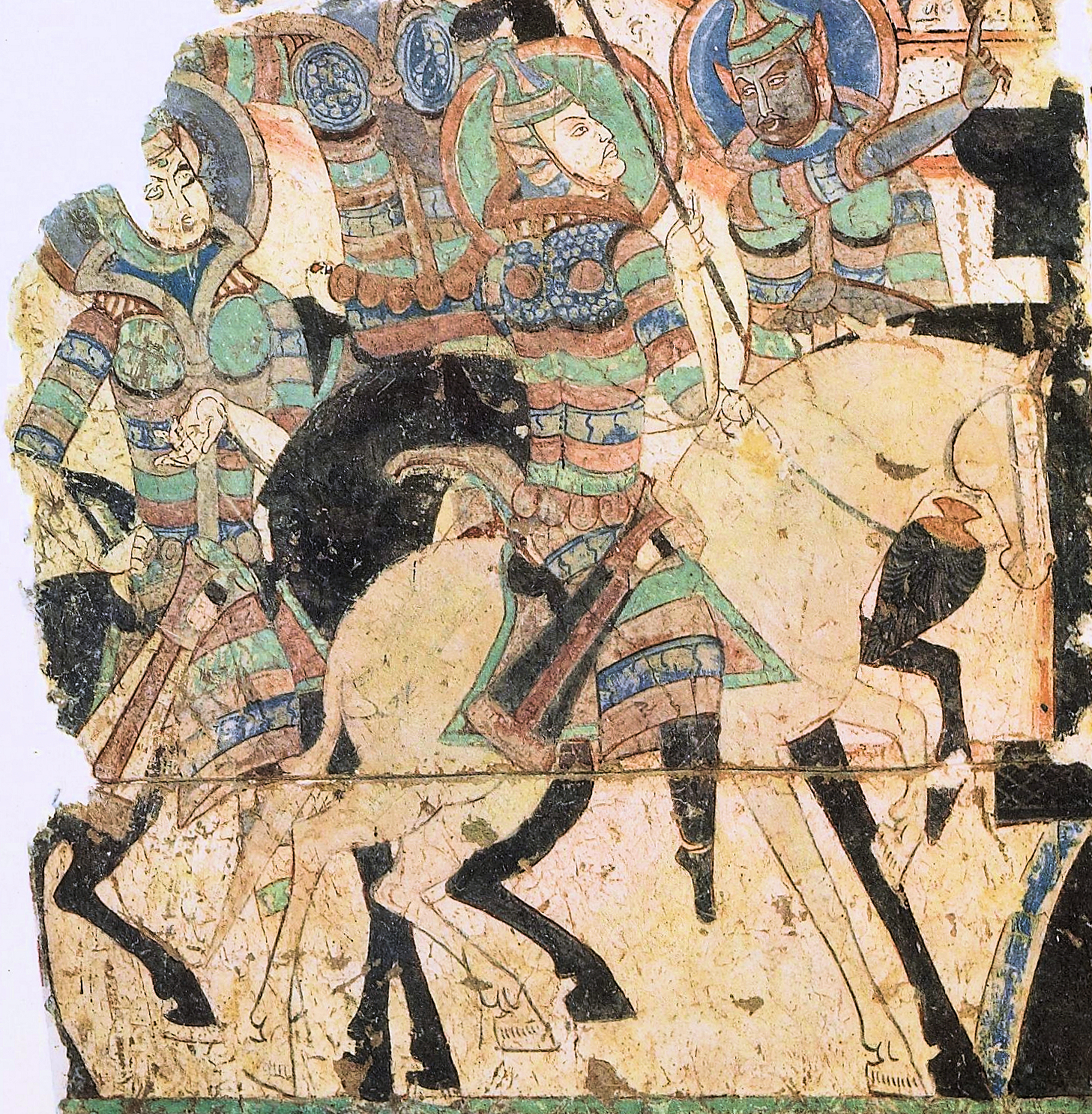
warriors in the Kizil Caves, following the events of 552 Turk uprising and the subsequent Turk expansion. 2nd half of the 6th century AD. The helmet is a characteristic pear-shaped segmented helmet of the Turkic type.

In the Kizil Caves in the Tarim Basin, knights wearing segmented pear-shaped helmets are depicted. It is thought that these depictions follow the events of the 552 Turk uprising and the subsequent Turk expansion, giving a date of the 2nd half of the 6th century AD. These helmets are characteristic pear-shaped segmented helmet of the Turkic type. They immediately follow the use of lamellar helmets, also visible in the Kizil Caves.

== Similar helmets ==
Similar but more simple helmets, the so-called broadband helmets were used in parallel. These helmets may have been used until the 10th century, as depicted in the Leiden Maccabees manuscript from the early 10th century. Related to the Spangenhelm were also lamellar helmets or intermediate Lamellar-Spangen helmets, like the helmet from a 6th-century boys grave, found under the Cologne Cathedral.

A similar construction principle is found in the northern ridge helmets, a group, which includes Scandinavian Vendel Era helmets and Anglo-Saxon helmets, like the Coppergate Helmet or the Pioneer Helmet.

== Notes ==
Portions of this article were translated from the German Wikipedia.
