= Lamellar helmet =

Helmet made of overlapping plates

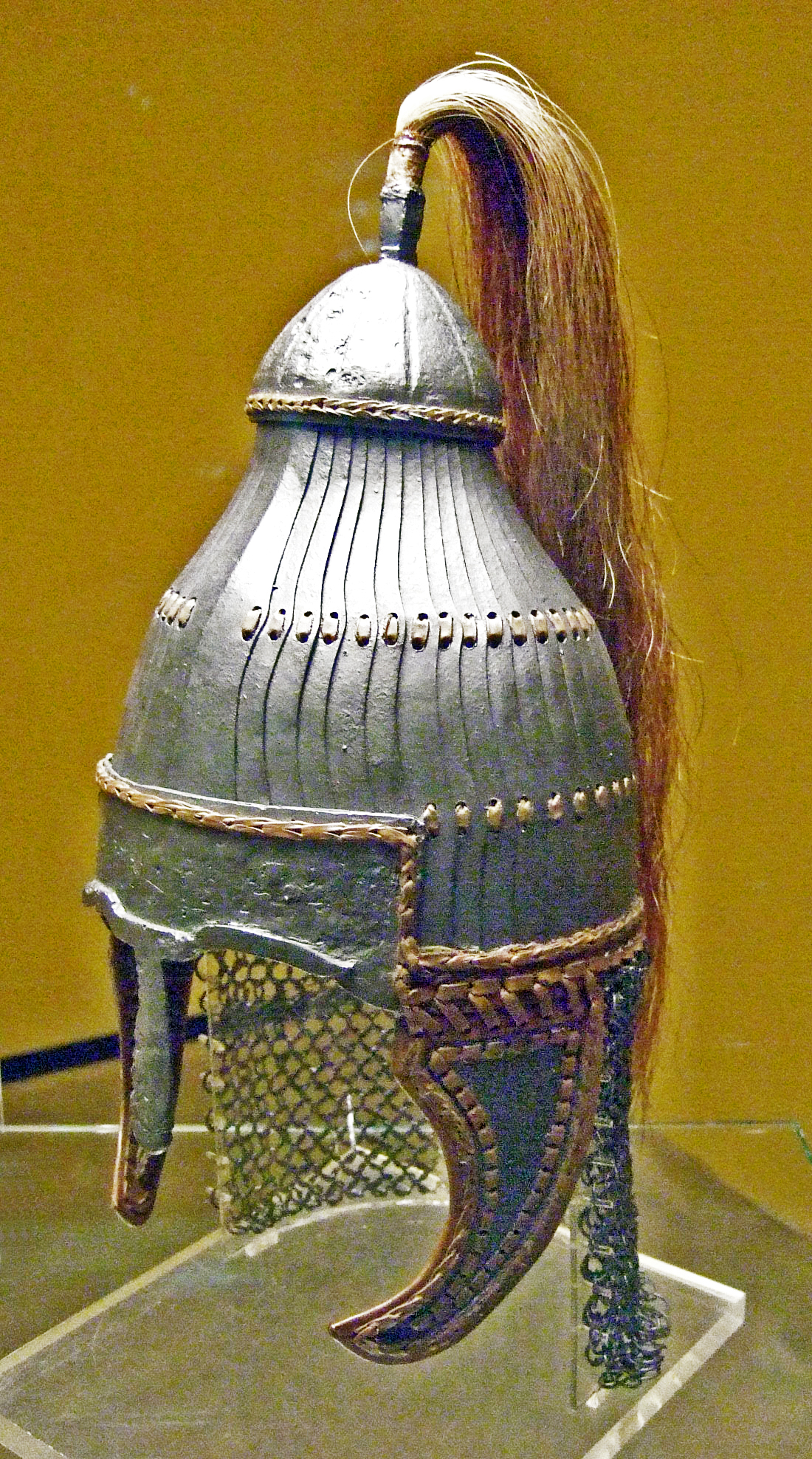
Reconstruction of the Lamellenhelm from Niederstotzingen. Dated 560-600 CE. This is considered as an Avar lamellar helmet.

The lamellar helmet (German language: Lamellenhelm, plural Lamellenhelme) was a type of helmet used in Europe during the Early Middle Ages. Examples are characterized by caps made from overlapping lamellar scales, in addition to a brow plate, cheek guards, and camail. They are distinct from the contemporary spangenhelm and crested helmets also found in Europe; unlike those, which are influenced by Roman designs, Lamellenhelme display eastern influence and have primarily been found in southeastern Europe. They are mostly associated with the Avars of Pannonia and the Lombards of Italy.

== Description ==
Lamellenhelme are characterized by overlapping plates—a form of lamellar armour—with caps of conical shape and plumes at the top. They also tend to have brow plates, cheek pieces, and, like spangenhelme, camail protecting the neck.

The Lamellenhelm is first attested in eastern Europe in the 5th century, with two specimens found in Kalkni and Kerch. It was one of three primary designs of helmets that proliferated throughout 6th- and 7th-century Europe; the others were the spangenhelm and the northern crested helmet. They are categorized by Heiko Steuer with 'other helmets of eastern origin,' and have been principally found in southeastern Europe. Unlike spangenhelme and the northern crested helmets, which likely derive from Roman helmet designs, the Lamellenhelm appears to have been used by and influenced by eastern European cultures, such as the Avars.

Lamellenhelme also seem to have been used by the Lombards, a Germanic people who ruled most of the Italian Peninsula from 568 to 774. This is suggested both by the discovery of parts of such helmets in Italy, and by the discovery of a brow plate displaying the inscription VICTORIA D[OMINO] N[OSTRO] AGILUL[FO] REGI, ("Victory to our lord, king Agilulf") which names Agilulf, a Lombard king who ruled from 591 to 616. The plate also contains a figural scene showing the seated king and, on his left and right, warriors who themselves are wearing comparable plumed helmets. The plate was once part of a helmet that was likely owned by a high-ranking follower of the king.

== Lamellar helmets in Central Asia ==
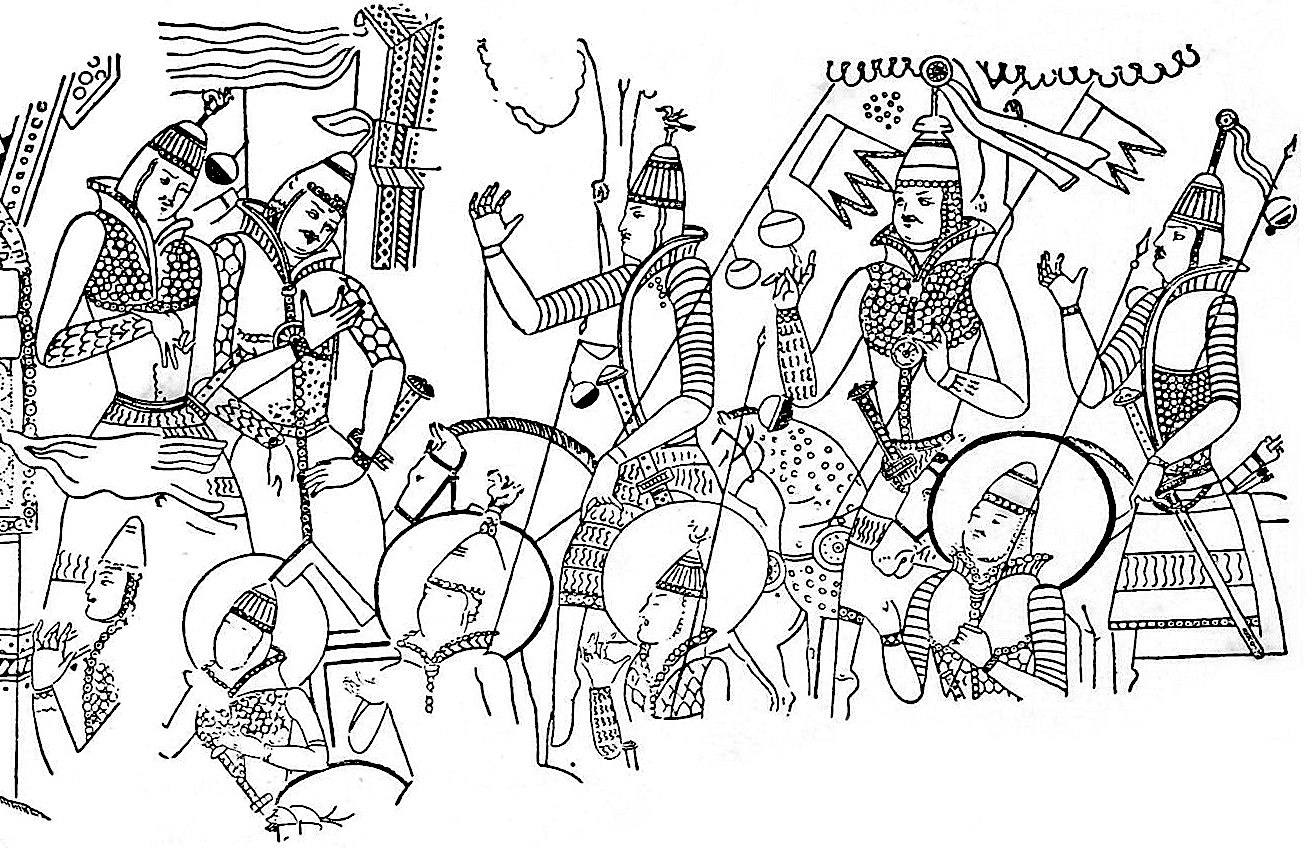
Knights wearing lamellar helmets depicted in the "Cave of the Painters" at the Kizil Caves, 5th century CE. The sword guards have typical Hunnish designs of rectangle or oval shapes with cloisonné ornamentation.

Lamellar helmets were popularized in Central Asia by the steppe nomads. Knights wearing dome-shaped lamellar helmets with cup-shaped finials, and armed with swords with Hunnish cloisonné designs, can be seen in the "Cave of the Painters" at the Kizil Caves, and are dated to the 5th century CE. Lamellar helmets were adopted by the Sasanian Empire when they took control of former Hephthalite territory. This type of helmet appears in sculptures on pillar capitals at Ṭāq-e Bostān and Behistun, and on the Anahita coinage of Khosrow II (r. 590-628 CE).

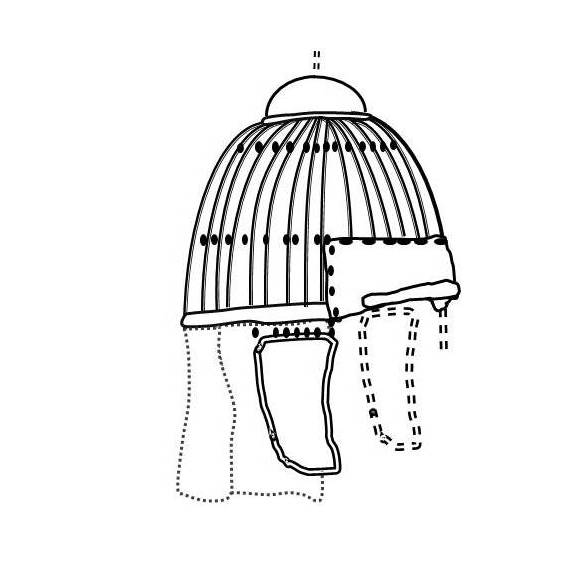
A print of a lamellar helmet

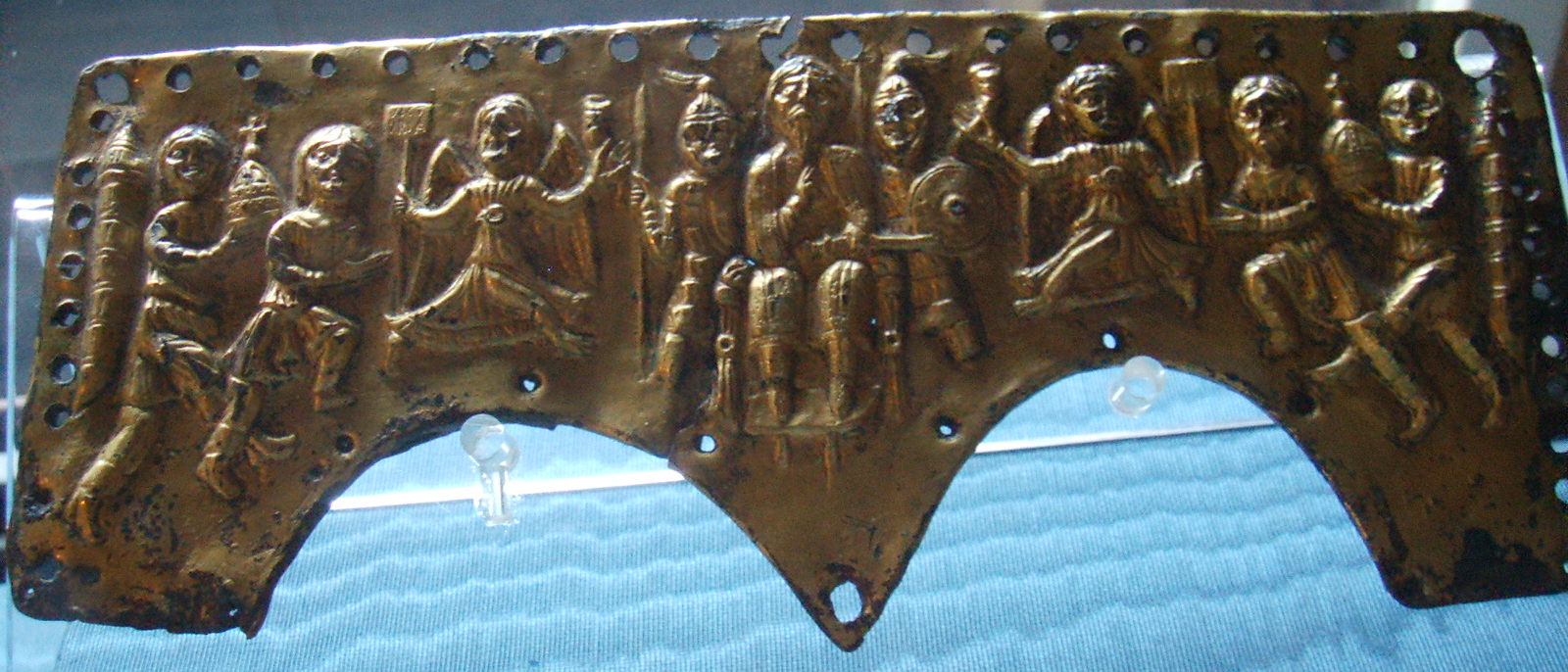
The Agiluf helmet plate

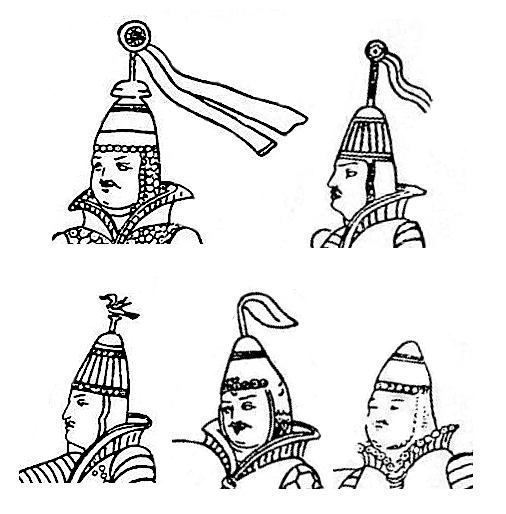
Helmets in the "Cave of the Painters", 5th century CE

== See also ==
- Spangenhelm

== Bibliography ==
- Steuer, Heiko (1987). "Helm und Ringschwert: Prunkbewaffnung und Rangabzeichen germanischer Krieger" [Helmet and Ring-Sword: Ornamental Weapons and Insignia of Germanic Warriors]. In Häßler, Hans-Jürgen (ed.). Studien zur Sachsenforschung [Studies in Saxon Research] (in German). Vol. 6. Hildesheim: Lax. pp. 189–236. ISBN 3-7848-1617-7.
- Tweddle, Dominic (1992). The Anglian Helmet from 16–22 Coppergate. The Archaeology of York. Vol. 17/8. London: Council for British Archaeology. ISBN 1-872414-19-2. Archived from the original on 21 March 2024.
