= Nasal helmet =

Medieval European, integral nose guard

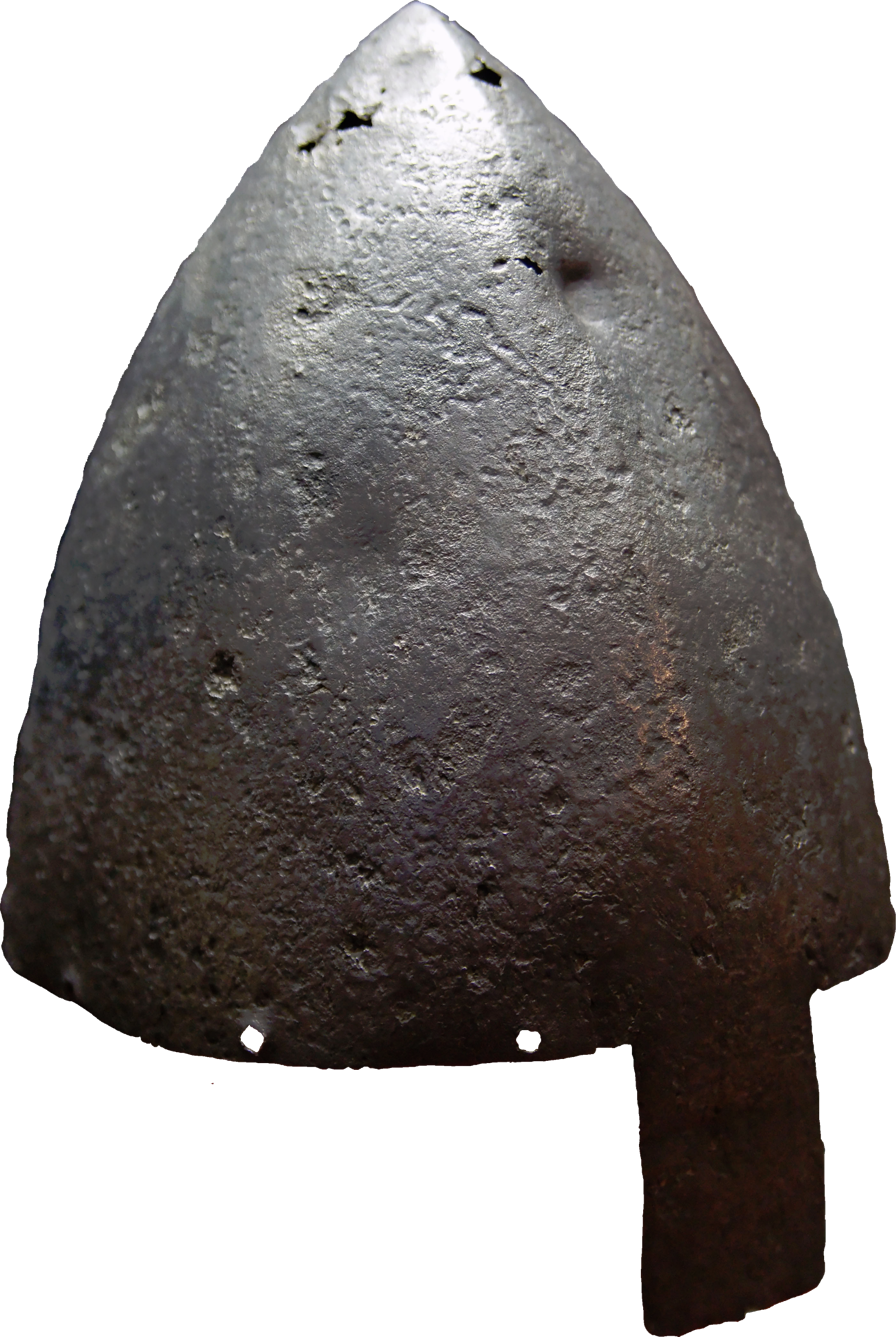
11th century Moravian nasal helmet, Vienna. One of the few remaining examples of such helmets.

The nasal helmet was a type of combat helmet characterised by the possession of a projecting bar covering the nose and thus protecting the centre of the face; it was of Western European origins and was used from the late 9th century to at least c. 1250.

== Early forms ==
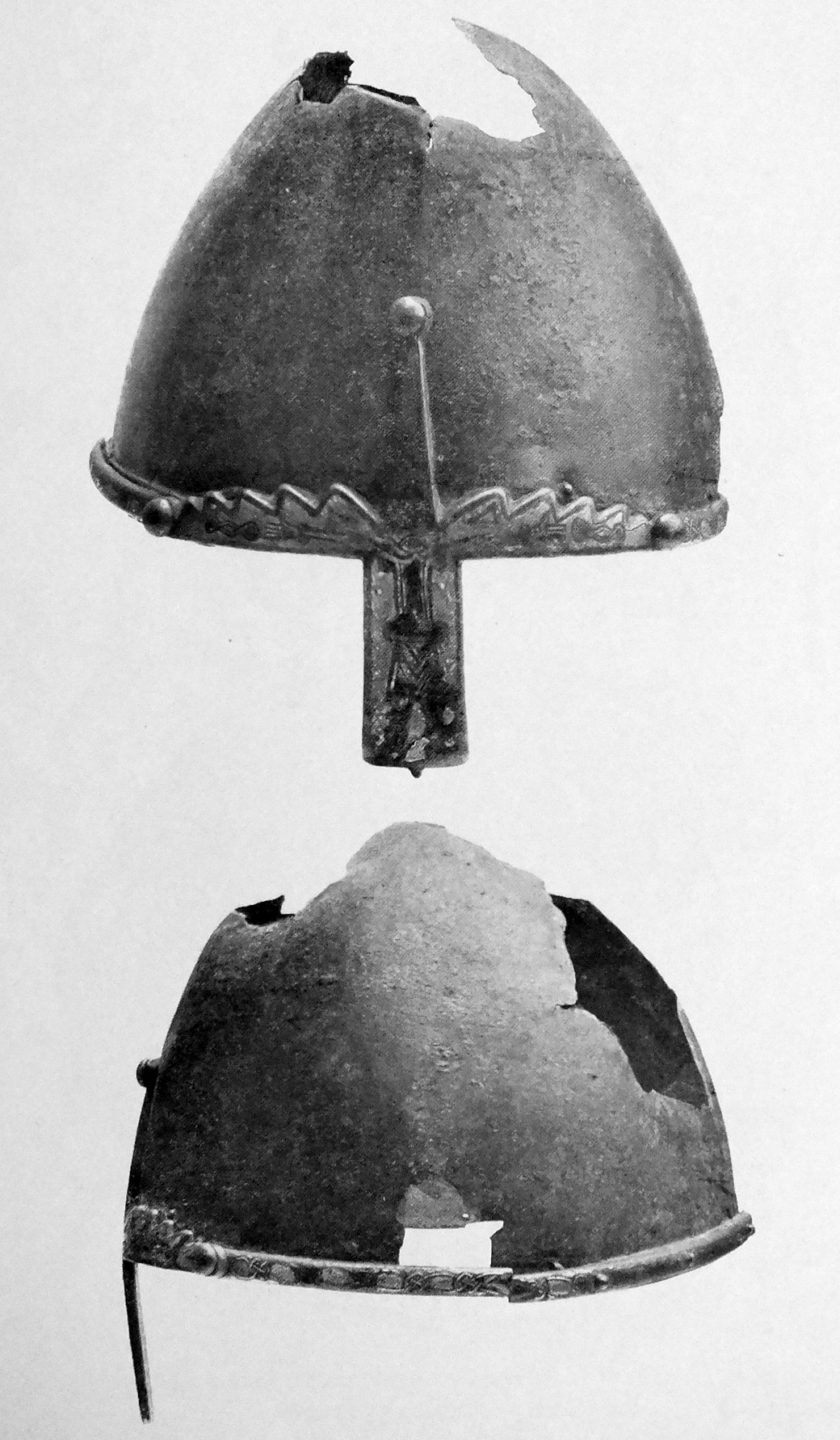
Helmet of Saint Wenceslaus, Prague

The nasal helmet was characterised by the possession of a nose-guard, or "nasal", composed of a single strip of metal that extended down from the skull or browband over the nose to provide facial protection. The helmet appeared throughout Western Europe late in the 9th century, and became the predominant form of head protection, replacing previous types of helmet whose design was ultimately based on Late Roman types such as the ridge helmet and early helmets of spangenhelm construction. Early nasal helmets were universally conical in shape. The skull could be raised from a single sheet of iron or be of composite, segmented (spangenhelm) construction. The spangenhelm variety was, in general, the earlier method of construction. Single-piece skulls, being technically more difficult to produce, became more common with the increase in metallurgical skill over time.

Though nasals had been used on earlier helmets, and on contemporary helmets found in Byzantium, Slavic Eastern Europe and the Middle East, those characteristic of the nasal helmet were in general larger and were fully integrated into either the skull or browband of the helmet. The nasals of other helmets tended to be riveted to the skull either directly or as part of a T-shaped, combined nasal and eyebrow-piece.

== Later developments ==
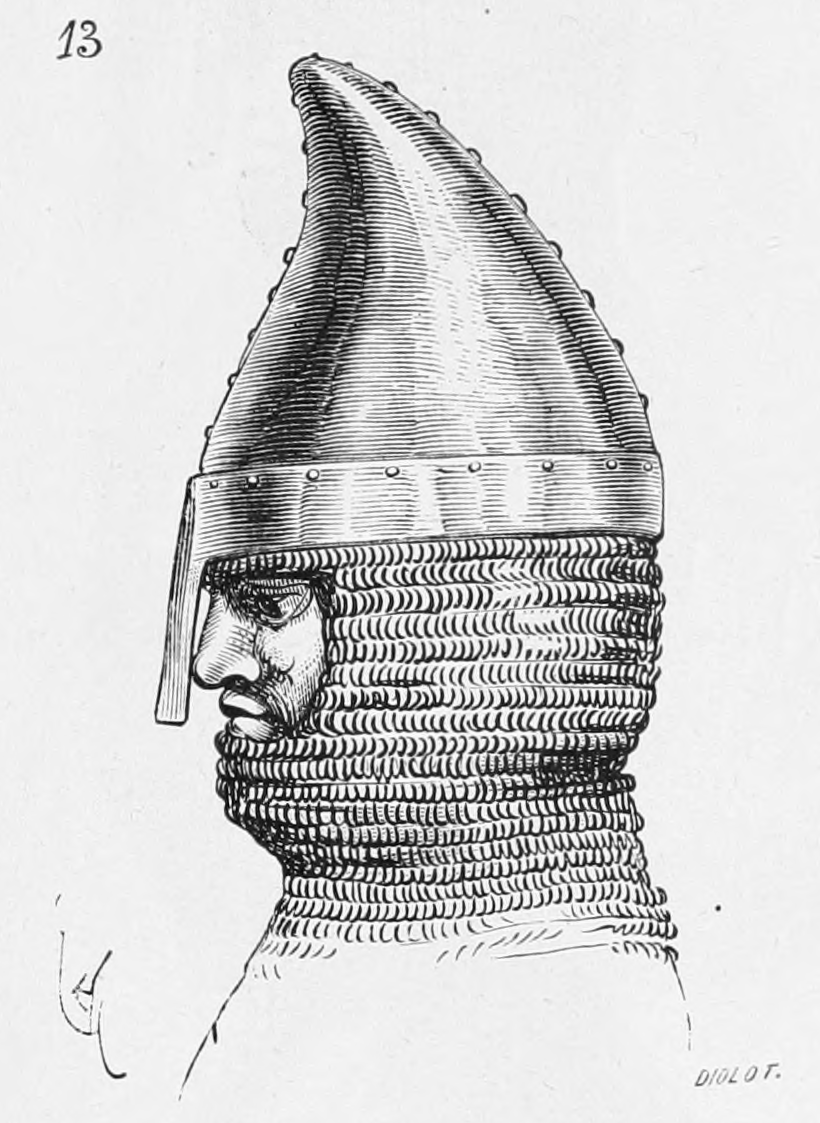
Nasal helmet of the "Phrygian cap" shape, 12th century

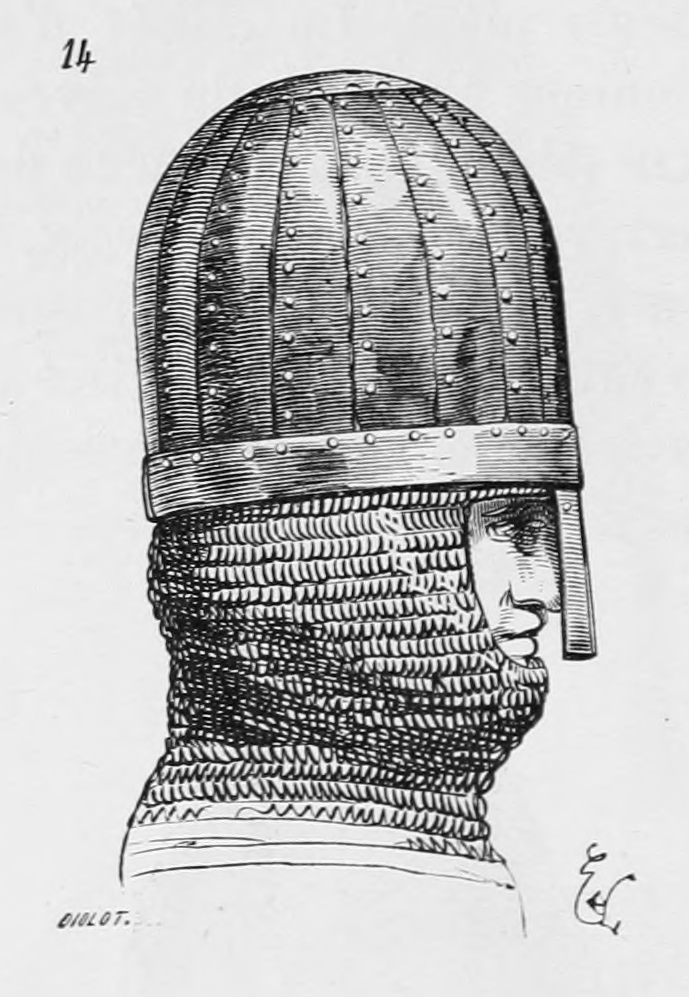
Nasal helmet with a rounded skull, latter part of the 12th century

From being uniformly conical in shape, the skull of the nasal helmet became more varied during the 12th century. For most of the century nasal helmets with a forward deflected apex, often called the "Phrygian cap" shape, were in widespread use. It is possible that the deflection of the apex of the skull was the natural result of making the front of the helmet thicker than the rest of the helmet during the process of raising the skull from sheet iron.

Though still used, the conical type of helmet declined in popularity during the latter half of the 12th century and round-topped nasal helmets came into fashion. King Richard I of England is depicted wearing a round-skulled nasal helmet on his first Great Seal (1189).

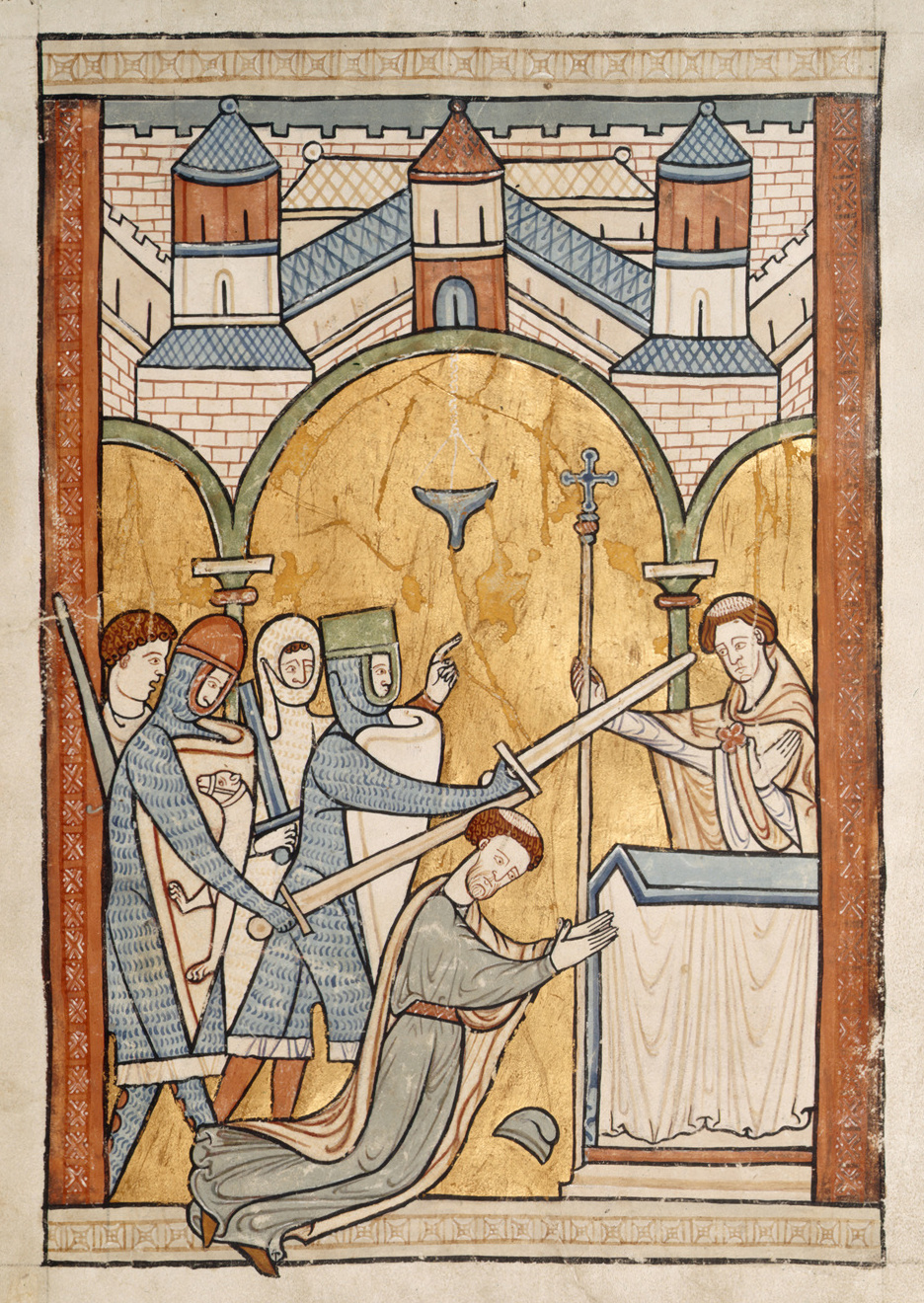
The knight at the centre is wearing a flat-topped helmet. Murder of Thomas Becket, manuscript c. 1200

A further type of nasal helmet developed in the late 12th century. This helmet had a flat top and a square profile. This form of nasal helmet was the forerunner of deeper, cylindrical helmets with greater facial protection, enclosed helmets, and eventually the great helm. The existing nasal formed the basis for increased facial protection, eventually, by 1200, producing a face covering plate which was pierced for sight and ventilation.

The helmet began to lose popularity at the end of the 12th century to helmets that provided more facial protection, and although the nasal helm lost popularity amongst the higher classes of knights and men-at-arms, they were still used by archers to whom a wide field of vision was crucial. Round-skulled nasal helmets can also be seen worn by a proportion of knights throughout the French Maciejowski Bible dating to 1250. No doubt some knights preferred the better vision and hearing afforded by this more open helmet.

== Use ==
The nasal helmet would usually have been worn over a mail coif, which protected the lower parts of the head, throat and neck. The coif could be a separate item of armour or be formed as an extension of the mailcoat itself. The existence of rivets and holes around the lower edge of these helmets indicate that they were lined in some manner, though no linings as such have survived. Practical considerations suggest that linings must have been adjustable to ensure a secure fit.

The nasals of these helmets were often so large that the wearer was unrecognisable to an observer. The celebrated incident at the Battle of Hastings, illustrated on the Bayeux Tapestry, where William the Conqueror had to lift his helmet to show his troops that he was still alive is an indication of the anonymity nasal helmets produced.
