= Great helm =

European helmet, 1210 to 1340 AD

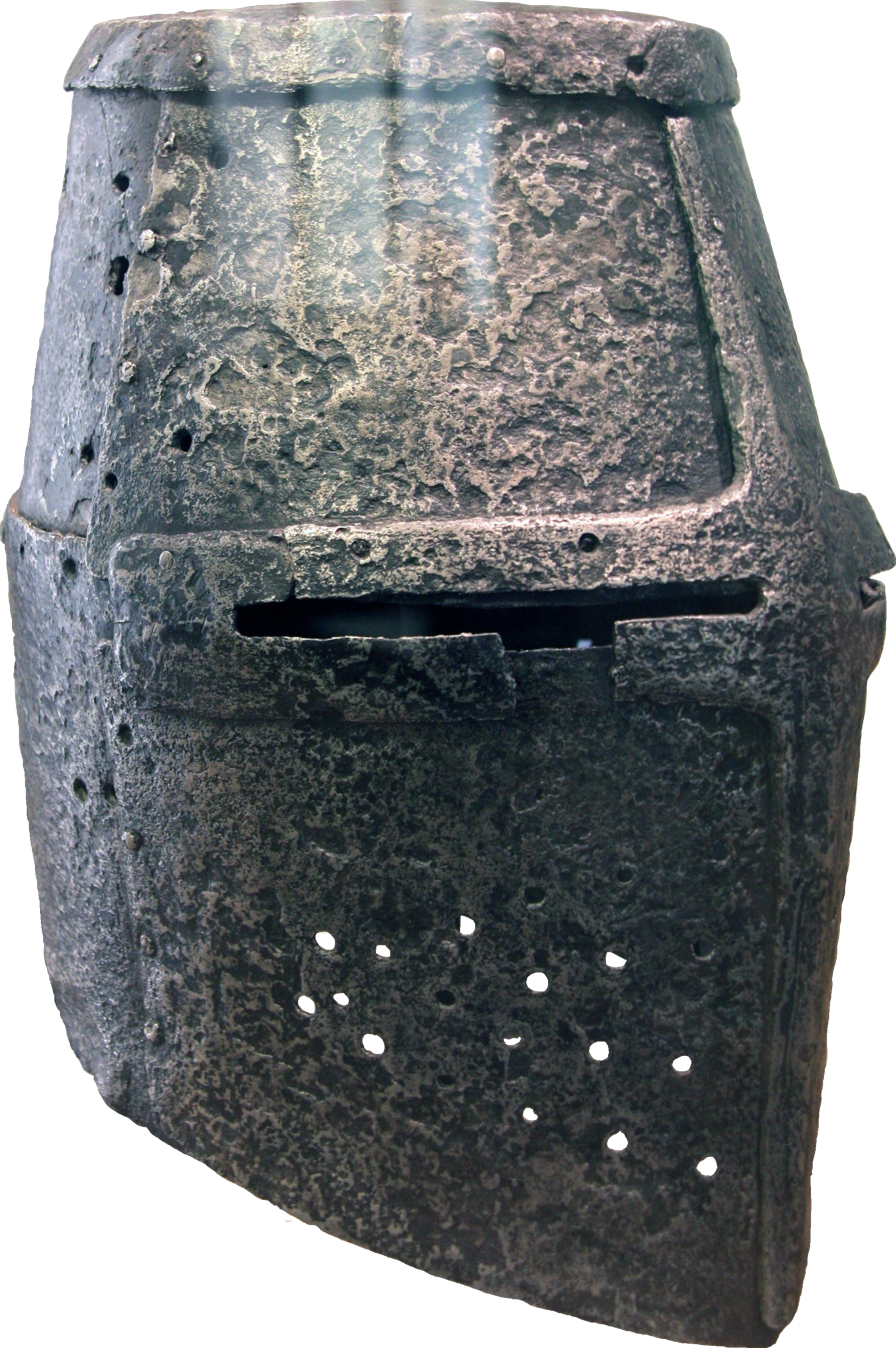
13th century German great helm with a flat top to the skull.

The great helm or heaume, also called pot helm, bucket helm and barrel helm, is a helmet of the High Middle Ages which arose in the late twelfth century in the context of the Crusades and remained in use until the fourteenth century. The barreled style was used by knights in most West European armies between about 1210 to 1340 AD and evolved into the frog-mouth helm to be primarily used during jousting contests.

== History ==
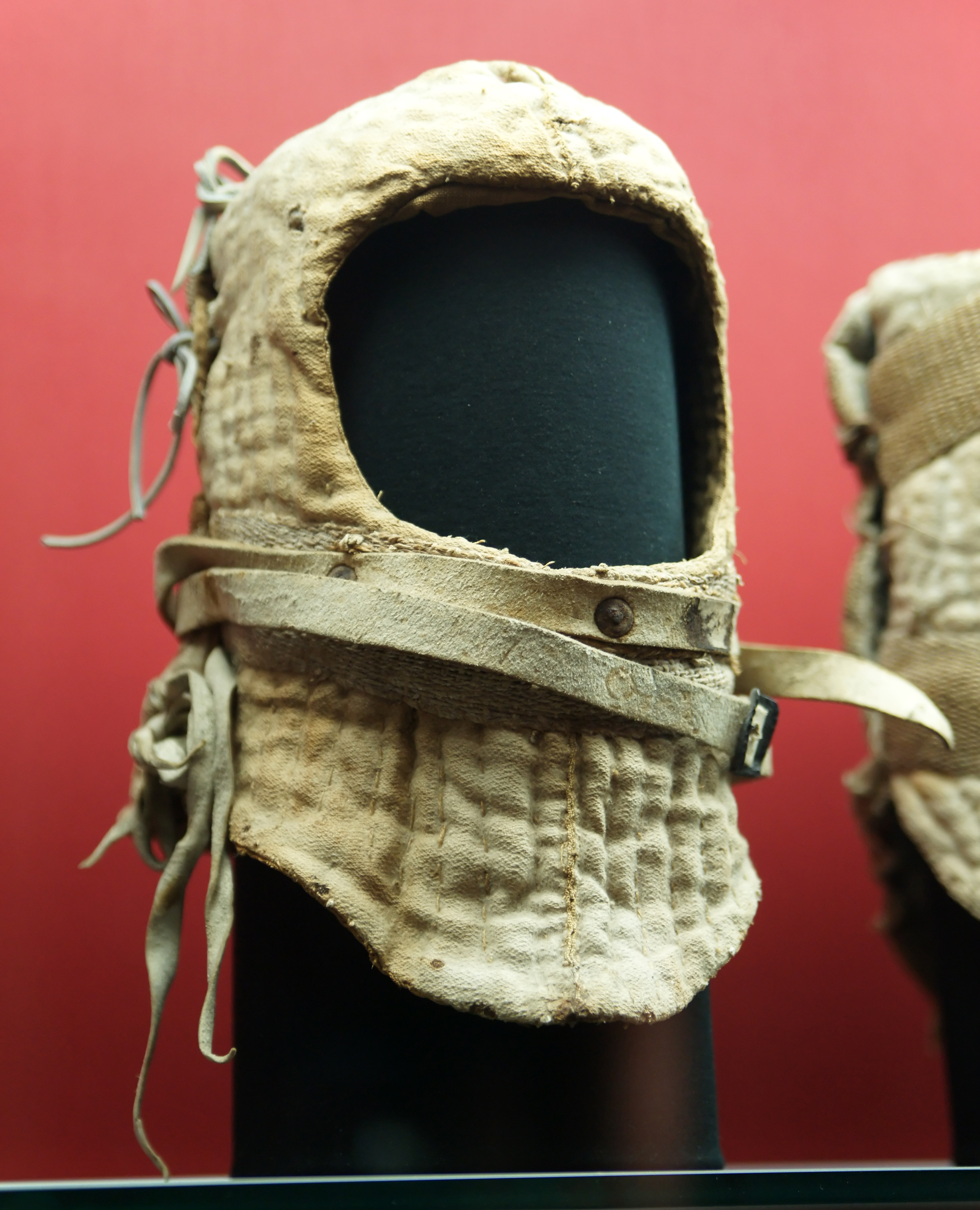
Great helms were worn with cloth and fiber padding on the inside, here shown removed from the helmet.

In its simplest form, the great helm was a flat-topped cylinder of steel that completely covered the head and had only very small openings for ventilation and vision. Later designs gained more of a curved design, particularly on the top, to deflect or lessen the impact of blows. The helmet was also extended downward until it reached shoulders.

The great helm ultimately evolved from the nasal helmet, which had been produced in a flat-topped variant with a square profile by about 1180. From this type of helmet an intermediate type, called an 'enclosed helmet' or 'primitive great helm', developed near the end of the 12th century. In this helmet the expansion of the nasal produced a full face-plate, pierced for sight and breathing. This helmet was largely superseded by the true great helm by c. 1240.

A later variant with a more conical top is known as a 'sugarloaf helm'. In Spanish they are called yelmo de Zaragoza, referring to Zaragoza where they were introduced for the first time in the Iberian peninsula.

Although the great helm offered vastly superior protection than previous helmets, such as the nasal helm and spangenhelm, it limited the wearer's peripheral vision, and in addition to being heavy, the mass-produced form (flat-topped without ventilation holes) provided little ventilation and could quickly overheat in hot weather. Knights usually wore the great helm over a mail coif (hood) sometimes in conjunction with a close-fitting iron skull cap known as a cervelliere. The later development of the cervelliere, the bascinet, was also worn beneath the great helm; men-at-arms would often remove the great helm after the first clash of lances, for greater vision and freedom of movement in melee combat. The bascinet had a mail curtain attached, a camail or aventail, which superseded the coif. Mail throat and neck defences such as these were made obsolete when plate gorgets were introduced, around 1400.

The bascinet evolved from its early skull cap form to supersede the great helm for combat. The great helm fell into disuse during the 15th century; however it was used commonly in tournaments where a version of the great helm, the frog-mouthed tilting helm, evolved.

Somewhere around 1600 Great helms became a popular part of Funeral Achievements.

== Decoration ==
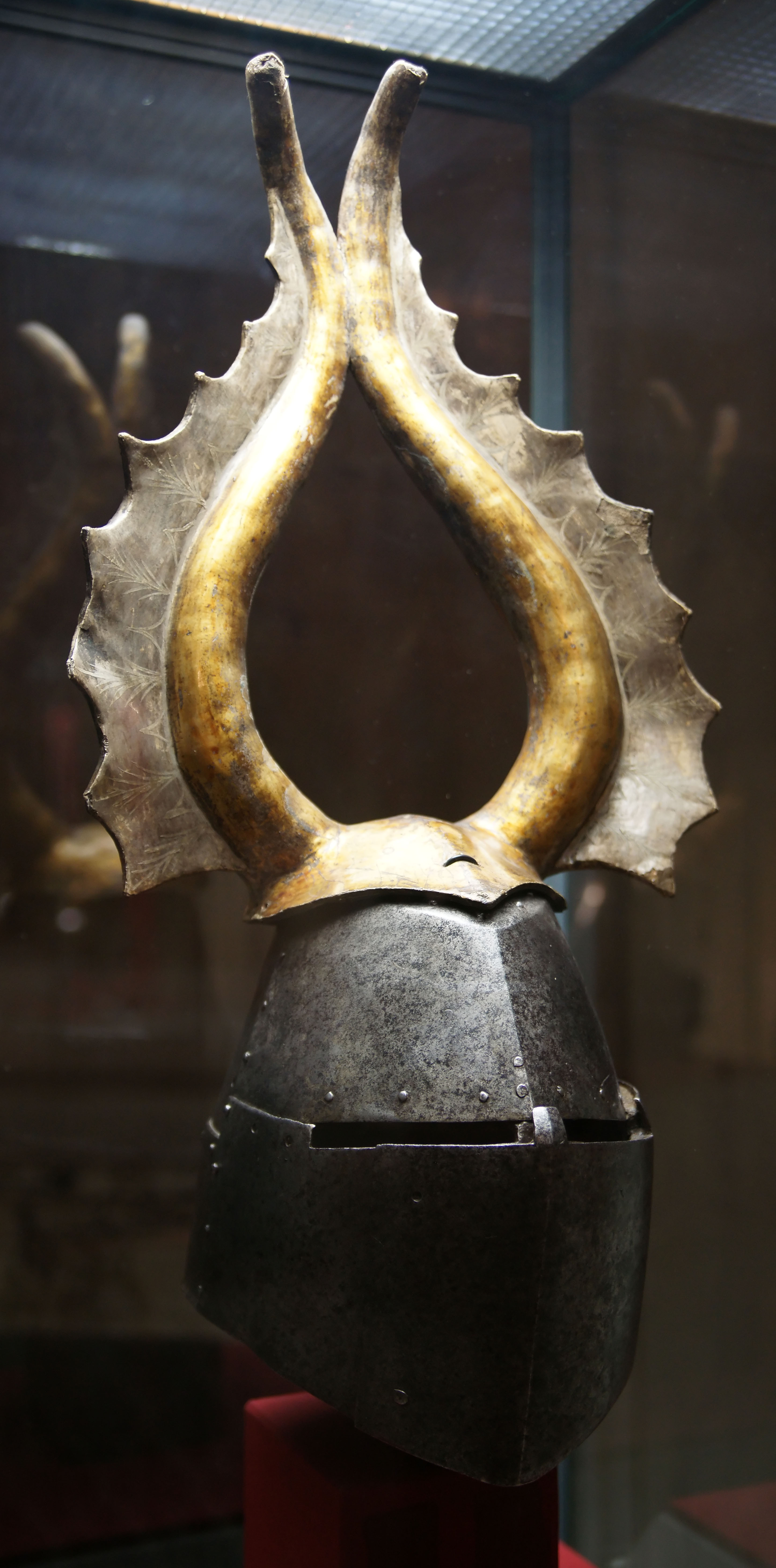
Funeral helmet of the von Pranckh family, 14th century, with the crest of two bullhorns. (Side view)

The Great Helm was often blackened, lacquered or painted, and frequently bore decorations such as:

- Ventilation decoration (crosses and symbols)
- Visor (horizontal and vertical "cross") decorations
- Crests, such as crowns, feathers, caps of maintenance, wings, lions, etc.

== Contemporary reenactors ==
The great helm is today especially popular amongst live-action role players and used in Medieval reenactment of the 13th and 14th centuries. It is inexpensive, easy to manufacture with even rudimentary equipment (metal scissors, drill, rudimentary anvil, rivets and hammer), and provides good protection for the head against both sharp and blunt weapons. Its biggest drawback is the square edges, that crumple very easily under blunt force trauma, and poor ventilation and air circulation. This can make it very hot in warm weather, although not much heavier, hotter or more cumbersome than a number of other medieval helmet styles. However period-accurate methods of padding and suspending the helmet can drastically improve the wearer's experiences.

Modern reenactment versions of great helms weigh 1.5 to 3 kg. They are sometimes but not always made from thicker steel than medieval originals yet are not usually overly heavy, cumbersome, or uncomfortable. Although visor slits are usually only some 20–30 mm wide, they do not greatly restrict the field of vision as they are very close to the wearer's eyes to reduce parallax.
