= Orle =

Orle may refer to:

== Places ==
- Orle, Grudziądz County, a village in Kuyavian-Pomeranian Voivodeship, Poland
- Orle, Nakło County, a village in Kuyavian-Pomeranian Voivodeship, Poland
- Orle, Radziejów County, a village in Kuyavian-Pomeranian Voivodeship, Poland
- Orle, Wejherowo County, a village in Pomeranian Voivodeship, Poland
- Orle, Kościerzyna County, a village in Pomeranian Voivodeship, Poland
- Orle, Łobez County, a village in West Pomeranian Voivodeship, Poland
- Orle, Wałcz County, a village in West Pomeranian Voivodeship, Poland
- Orle, Croatia, a village in Zagreb County, Croatia
- Orle, Škofljica, a settlement in the Municipality of Škofljica, Slovenia
- Dolnje Orle, a village in the Municipality of Sevnica, Slovenia
- Gornje Orle, a village in the Municipality of Sevnica, Slovenia
- Orlé, a village in Asturias, Spain

== Other ==
- Orle (helmet decoration), a decorative chaplet worn on bascinet helmets in the 15th century
- Orle (heraldry), a bordure detached from the edge of the shield
- Orle (film), a 1927 silent Polish film
