= Bascinet =

Medieval European open-faced military helmet

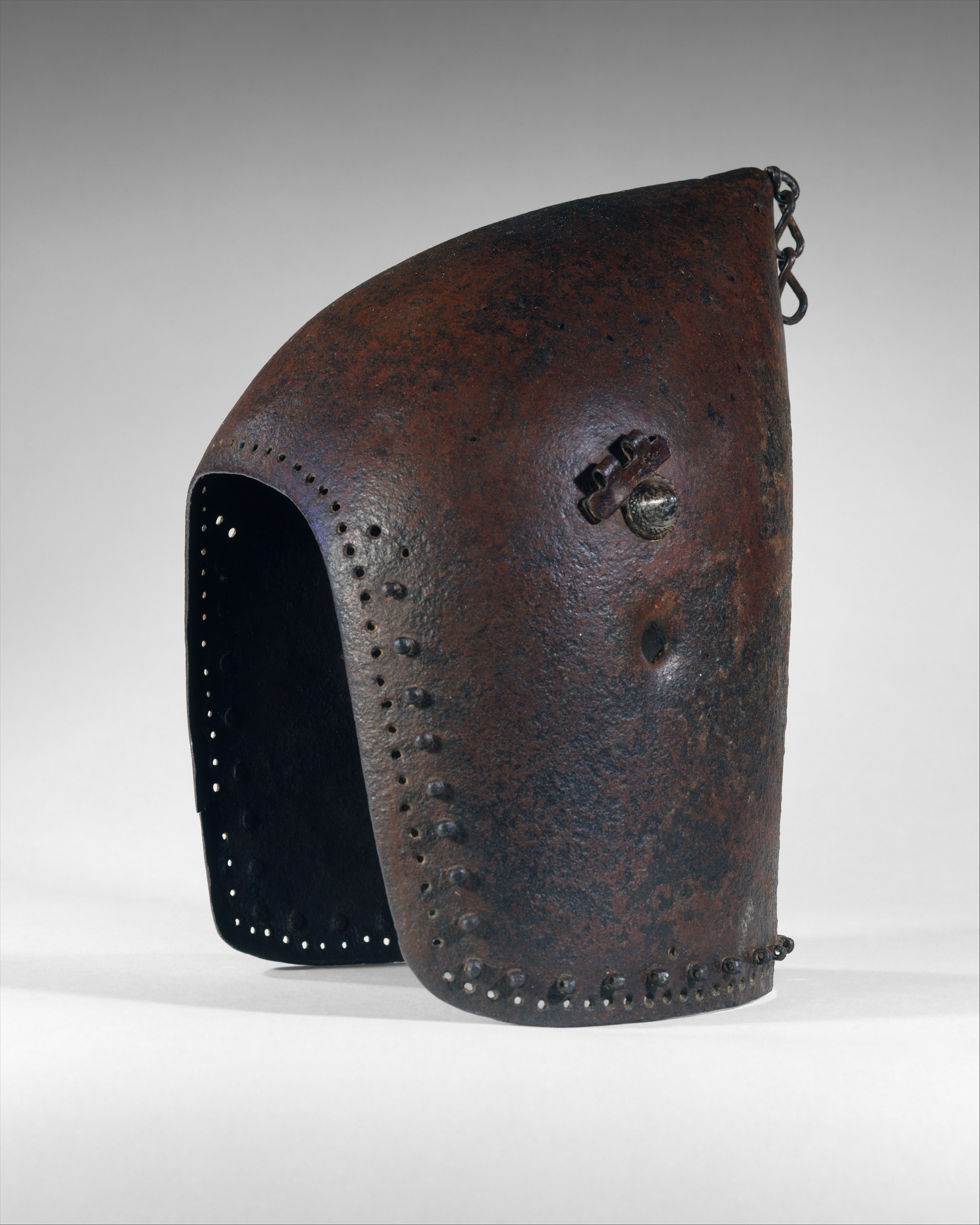
Bascinet without accessories

The bascinet – also bassinet, basinet, or bazineto – was a Medieval European open-faced combat helmet. It evolved from a type of iron or steel skullcap, but had a more pointed apex to the skull, and it extended downwards at the rear and sides to afford protection for the neck. A mail curtain (aventail or camail) was usually attached to the lower edge of the helmet to protect the throat, neck and shoulders. A visor (face guard) was often employed from c. 1330 to protect the exposed face. Early in the fifteenth century, the camail began to be replaced by a plate metal gorget, giving rise to the so-called "great bascinet".

== Early development ==
The first recorded reference to a bascinet, or bazineto, was in the Italian city of Padua in 1281, when it is described as being worn by infantry.

It is believed that the bascinet evolved from a simple iron skullcap, known as the cervelliere, which was worn with a mail coif, as either the sole form of head protection or beneath a great helm. The bascinet is differentiated from the cervelliere by having a higher, pointed skull. By about 1330 the bascinet had been extended lower down the sides and back of the head. Within the next 20 years it had extended to the base of the neck and covered the cheeks. The bascinet appeared quite suddenly in the later 13th century and some authorities see it as being influenced by Byzantine or Middle-Eastern Muslim helmets. The bascinet, without a visor, continued to be worn underneath larger "great helms" (also termed heaumes).

== Protection for the throat, neck and face ==
=== Camails or aventails ===
Unlike the cervelliere, which was worn in conjunction with, often underneath, a complete hood of mail called the coif, early bascinets were typically worn with a neck and throat defence of mail that was attached to the lower edge of the helmet itself; this mail "curtain" was called a camail or aventail. The earliest camails were riveted directly to the edge of the helmet, however, beginning in the 1320s a detachable version replaced this type. The detachable aventail was attached to a leather band, which was in turn attached to the lower border of the bascinet by a series of staples called vervelles. Holes in the leather band were passed over the vervelles, and a waxed cord was passed through the holes in the vervelles to secure it.

=== Bretache ===
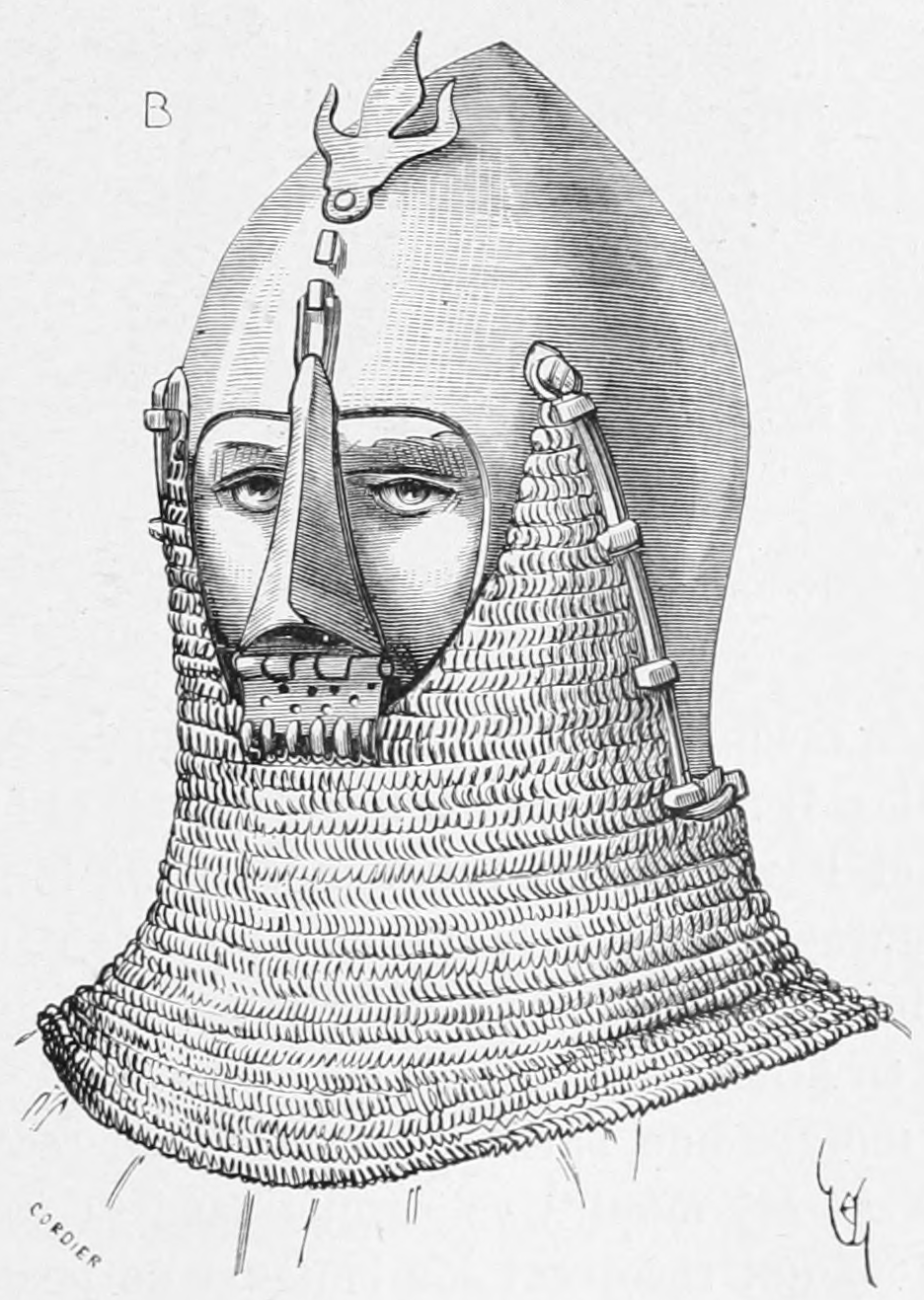
Bascinet with a bretache (nose protection) and aventail (chainmail neck protection)

This illustration shows a bascinet with a type of detachable nasal (nose protector) called the bretache or bretèche made of sheet metal. The bretache was attached to the aventail at the chin, and it fastened to a hook or clamp on the brow of the helmet. According to Boeheim, this type of defence was prevalent in Germany, appearing around 1330 and fading from use around 1370. (Note: The illustration, taken from Viollet-le-Duc, occurs under the heading of "Barbute" (Viollet-le-Duc 1874, volume 5, p.187 ) and not "Bacinet". Viollet-le-Duc refers to the nose piece merely as a "nasal. However, Nicolle defines the barbute, or barbuta, as a "deep form of bascinet protecting much of the face". Nicolle (1996), p. 62.) The bretache was also used in Italy; one of the first representations of it is on the equestrian statue of Cangrande I della Scala, who died in 1329. It is also shown on the tomb of Bernardino dei Baranzoni in the Museo Lapidario Estense in Modena, created c. 1345–50. An advantage of the bretache was that it could be worn under a great helm, but afforded some facial protection when the great helm was taken off. Use of the bretache preceded and overlapped with that of a new type of visor used with the bascinet, the "klappvisor" or "klappvisier".

=== Visored bascinets ===
The open-faced bascinet, even with the mail aventail, still left the exposed face vulnerable. However, from about 1330, the bascinet was often worn with a "face guard" or movable visor.

The "klappvisor" or klappvisier was a type of visor employed on bascinets from around 1330–1340; this type of visor was hinged at a single point in the centre of the brow of the helmet skull. It was particularly favoured in Germany, but was also used in northern Italy where it is shown in a Crucifixion painted in the chapter hall of Santa Maria Novella in Florence, c. 1367. Its use in Italy seems to have ceased around 1380, but continued in Germany into the 15th century. The klappvisor has been characterised as being intermediate between the bretache nasal and the side pivoting visor. Sources disagree on the nature of the klappvisier. A minority, including De Vries and Smith, class all smaller visors, those that only cover the area of the face left exposed by the aventail, as klappvisiers, regardless of the construction of their hinge mechanism. However, they agree that klappvisiers, by their alternative definition of 'being of small size', preceded the larger forms of visor, which almost exclusively employed the double pivot, found in the latter part of the 14th century.

The side-pivot mount, which used two pivots – one on each side of the helmet, is shown in funerary monuments and other pictorial or sculptural sources of the 1340s. One of the early depictions of a doubly pivoted visor on a bascinet is the funerary monument of Sir Hugh Hastings (d. 1347) in St. Mary's Church, Elsing, Norfolk, England. The pivots were connected to the visor by means of hinges to compensate for any lack of parallelism between the pivots. The hinges usually had a removable pin holding them together, this allowed the visor to be completely detached from the helmet, if desired. The side-pivot system was commonly seen in Italian armours.

=== Hounskull ===
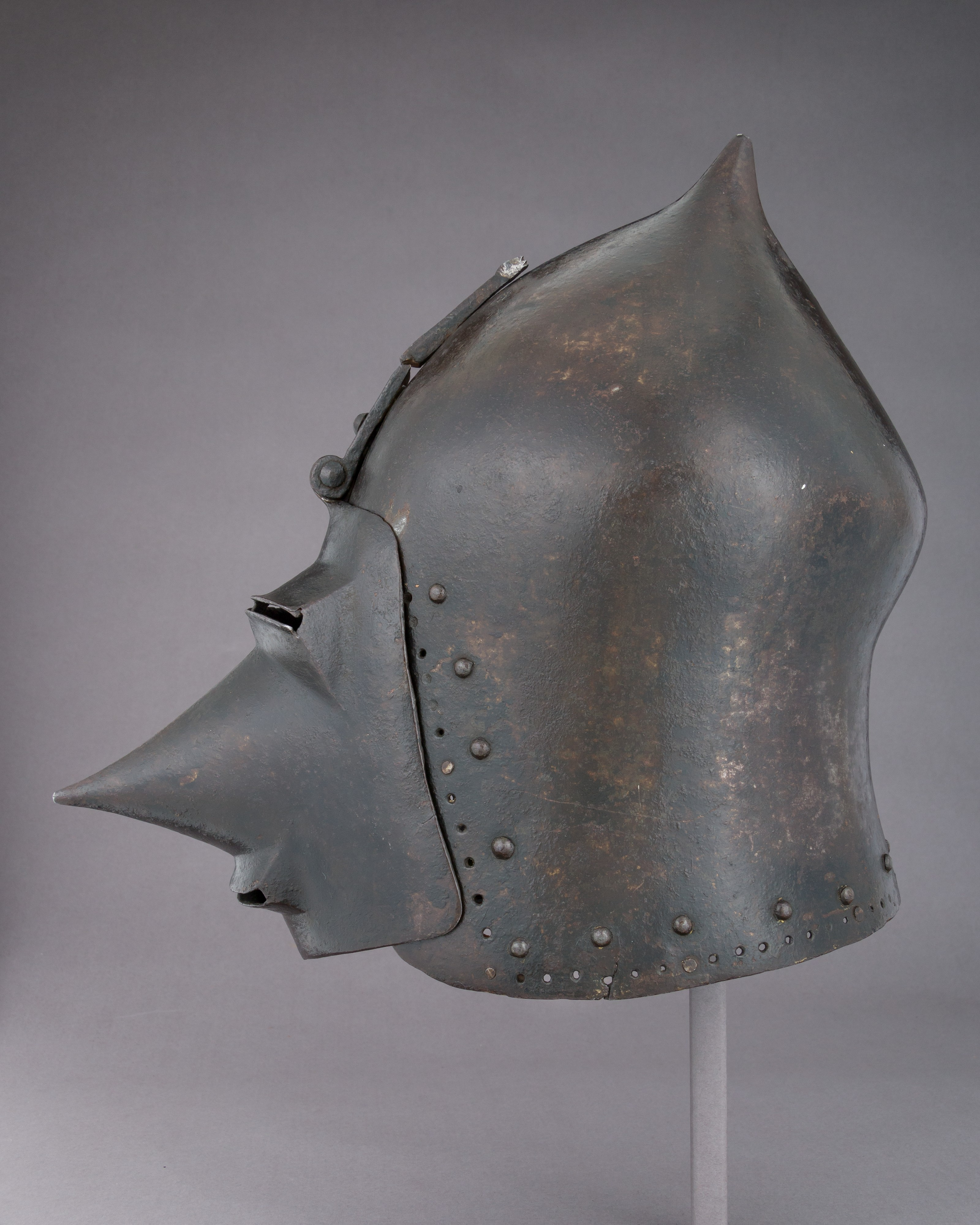
Hounskull visor attached by a brow-mounted pivot (klappvisier)

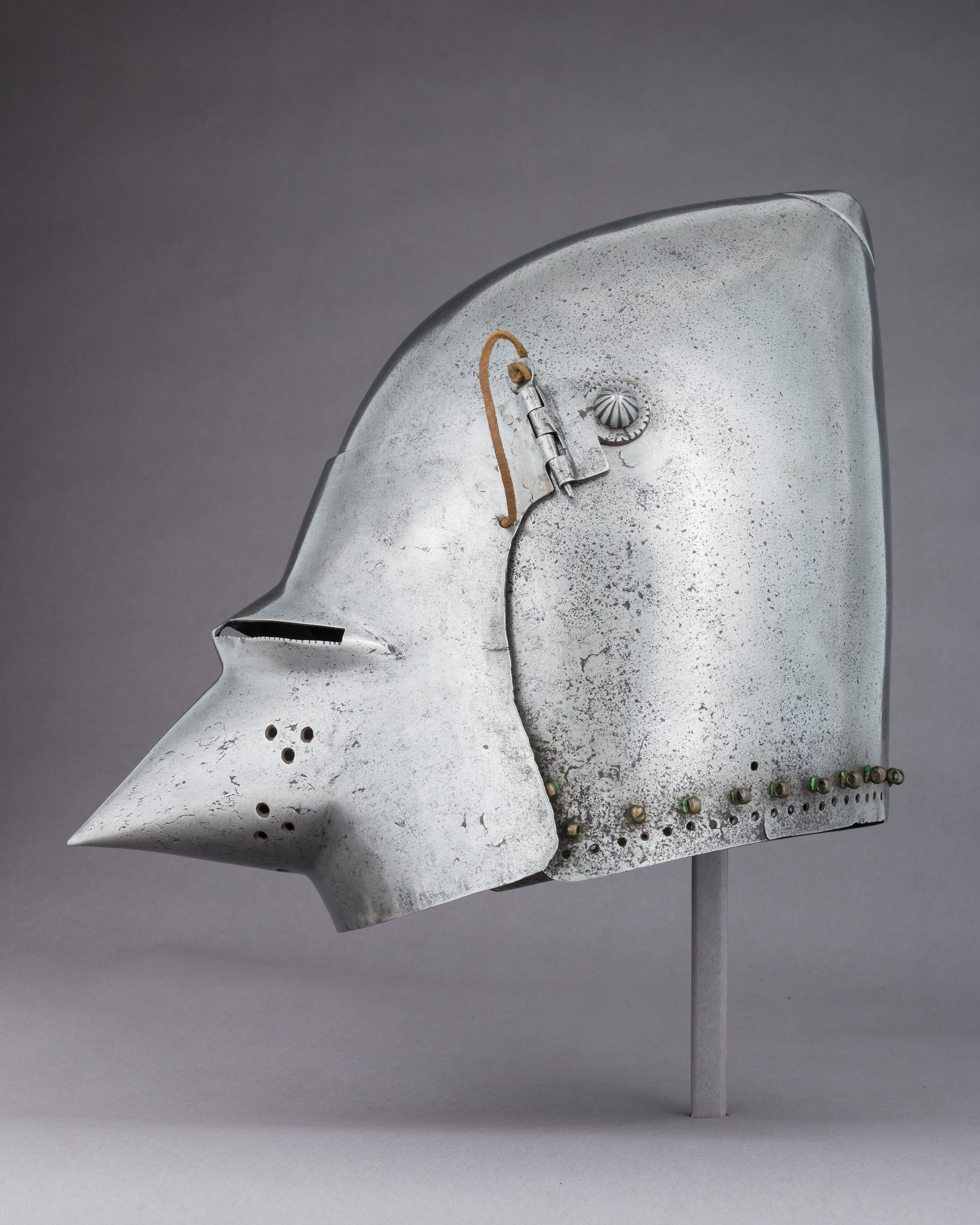
Hounskull visor attached by side-mounted pivot

Whether of the klappvisor or double-pivot type, the visors of the first half of the 14th century tended to be of a relatively flat profile with little projection from the face. They had eye-slits surrounded by a flange to help deflect weapon points. From around 1380 the visor, by this time considerably larger than earlier forms, was drawn out into a conical point like a muzzle or a beak, and was given the names "hounskull" (from the German hundsgugel – "hound's hood") or "pig-faced" (in modern parlance). The protruding muzzle gave better protection to the face from blows by offering a deflecting surface. It also improved ventilation, as its greater surface area allowed it to have more holes for air to pass through.

=== Rounded visors ===
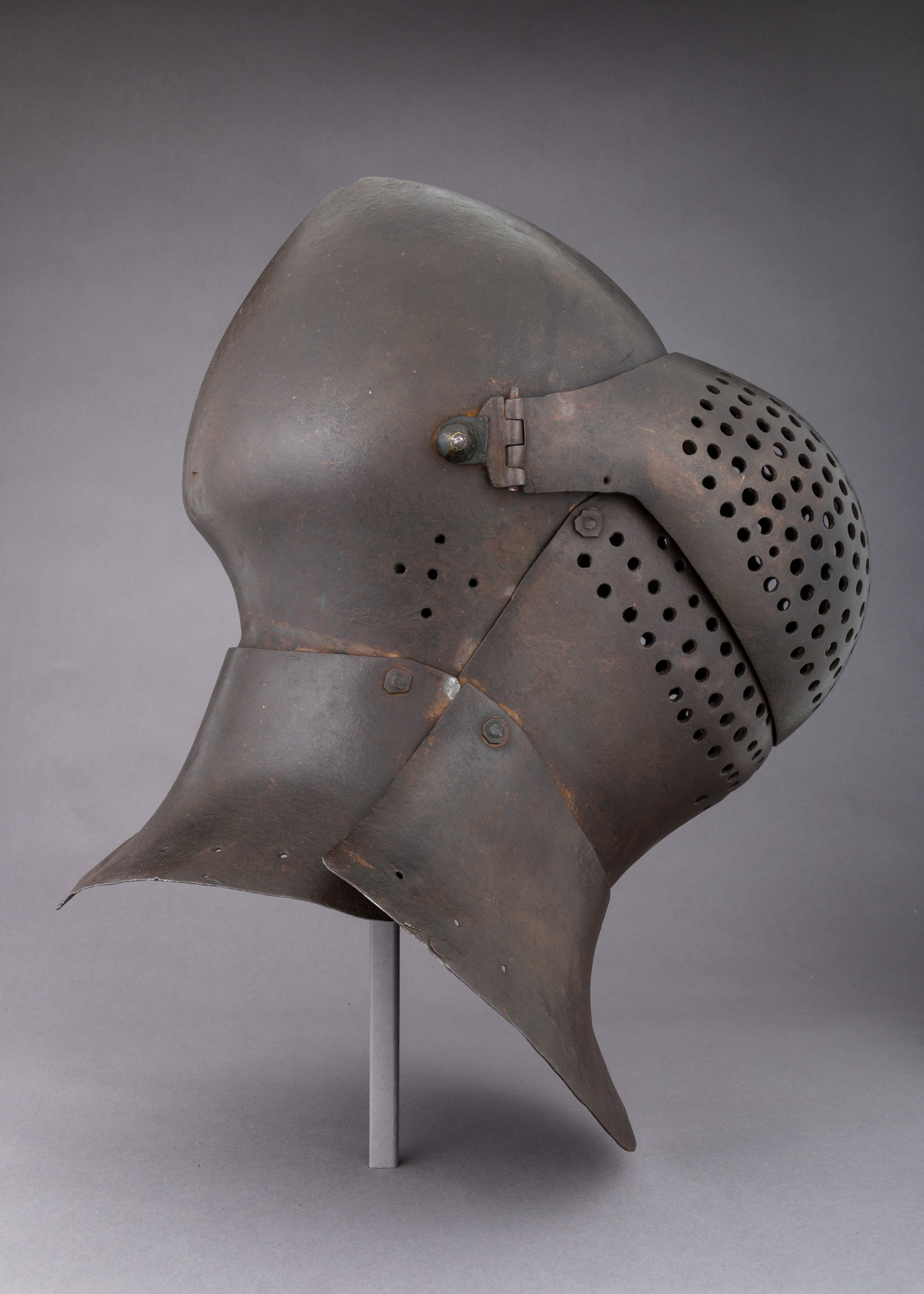
A great bascinet with a rounded visor

From about 1410 the visor attached to bascinets lost its pointed hounskull shape, and became progressively more rounded. By 1435 it gave an "ape-like" profile to the helmet; by 1450 it formed a sector in the, by then, almost globular bascinet. Ventilation holes in the visor tended to become larger and more numerous.

== Later evolution of the helmet ==
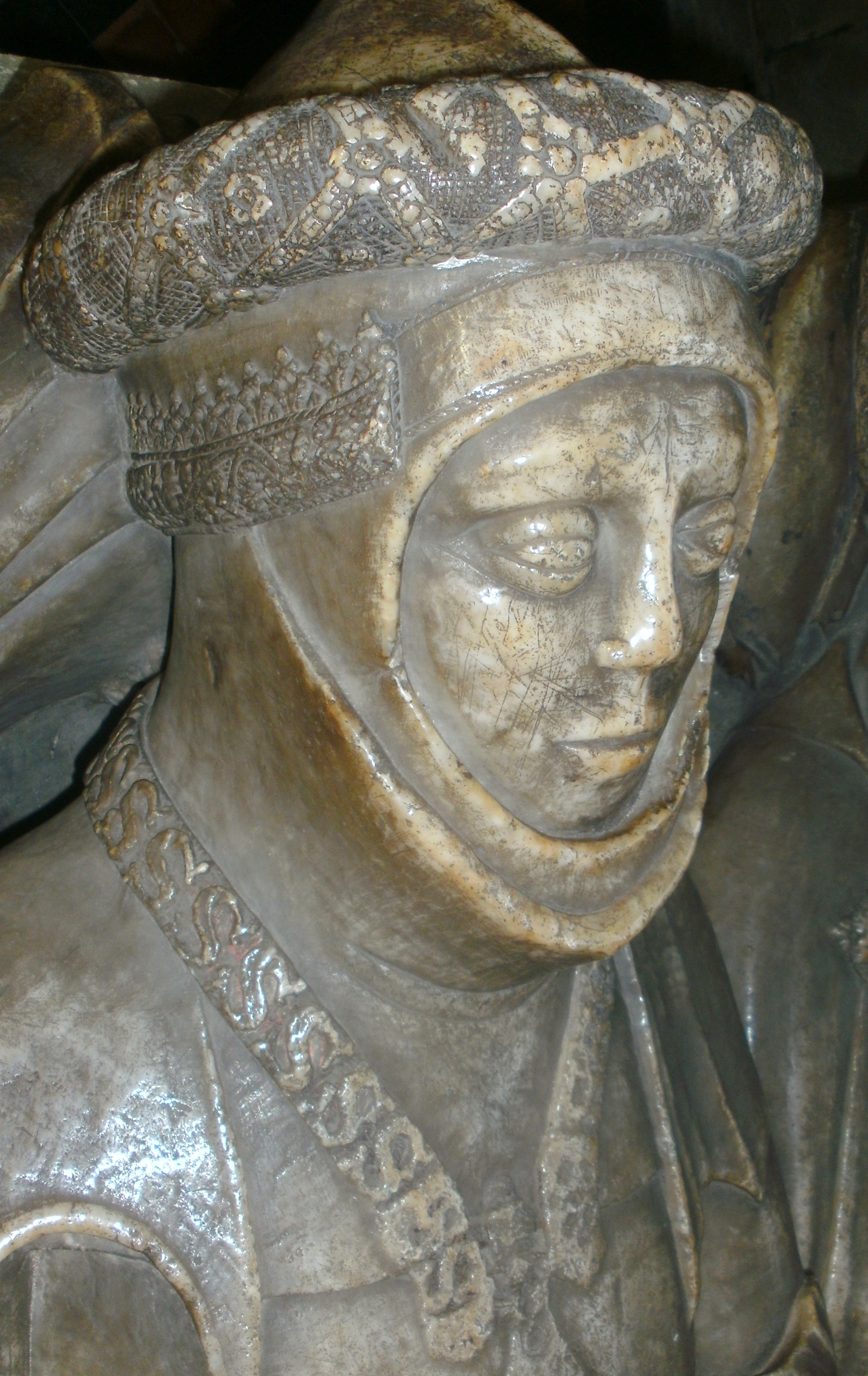
Tomb effigy showing a bascinet with baviere, worn with a plate gorget and a decorative orle. The helmet would be free to rotate within the gorget. English, c. 1450

Between c. 1390 and 1410 the bascinet had an exaggeratedly tall skull with an acutely pointed profile – sometimes so severe as to have a near-vertical back. Ten years later both the skull of the helmet and the hinged visor started to become less angular and more rounded. Almost globular forms became common by c. 1450. As part of the same process the helmet became more close-fitting, and narrowed to follow the contours of the neck.

=== Bevors and gorgets ===
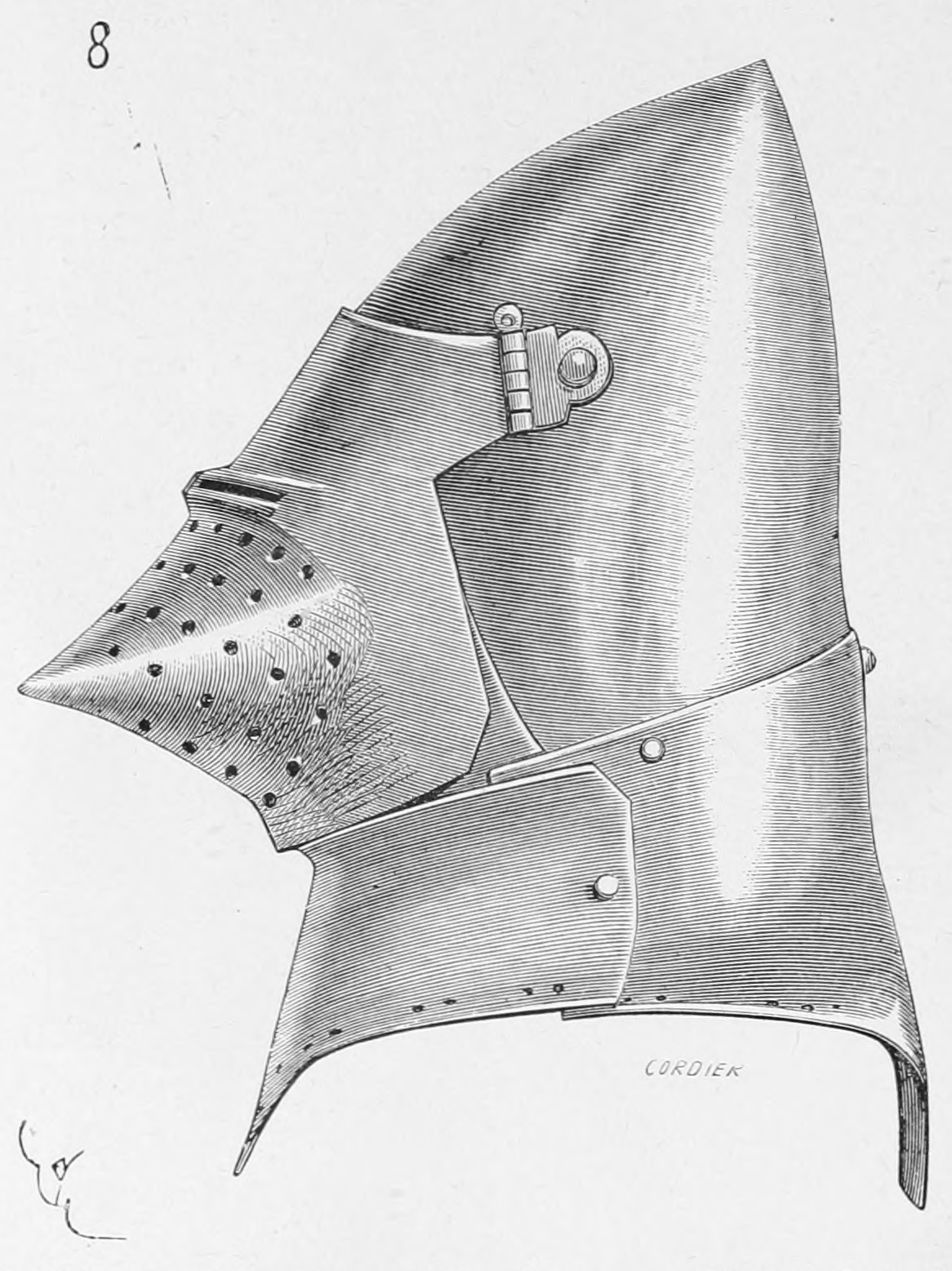
Early great bascinet, c. 1400, with plate gorget and exaggeratedly tall skull. The skull of the helmet is riveted to the rear gorget plate, this immobility is considered the defining feature of great bascinets.

Around 1350, during the reign of John II, French bascinets began to be fitted with a hinged chin- or jaw-piece (bevor (sense 2), French: bavière), upon which the visor would be able to rest. The visor and bevor that closed flush with each other thus provided better protection against incoming sword blows. This type of defence augmented the camail rather than replaced it.

The bascinet fitted with a camail was relatively heavy and most of the weight was supported directly by the head. Plate gorgets were introduced from c. 1400–1410, which replaced the camail and moved the weight of the throat and neck defences from the head to the shoulders. At the same time a plate covering the cheeks and lower face was introduced also called the bavière (contemporary usage was not precise). This bavière was directly attached by rivets to the skull of the bascinet. The combined skull and bavière could rotate within the upper part of the gorget, which overlapped them. A degree of freedom of movement was retained, but was probably less than had been the case with the mail camail.

=== Great bascinet ===
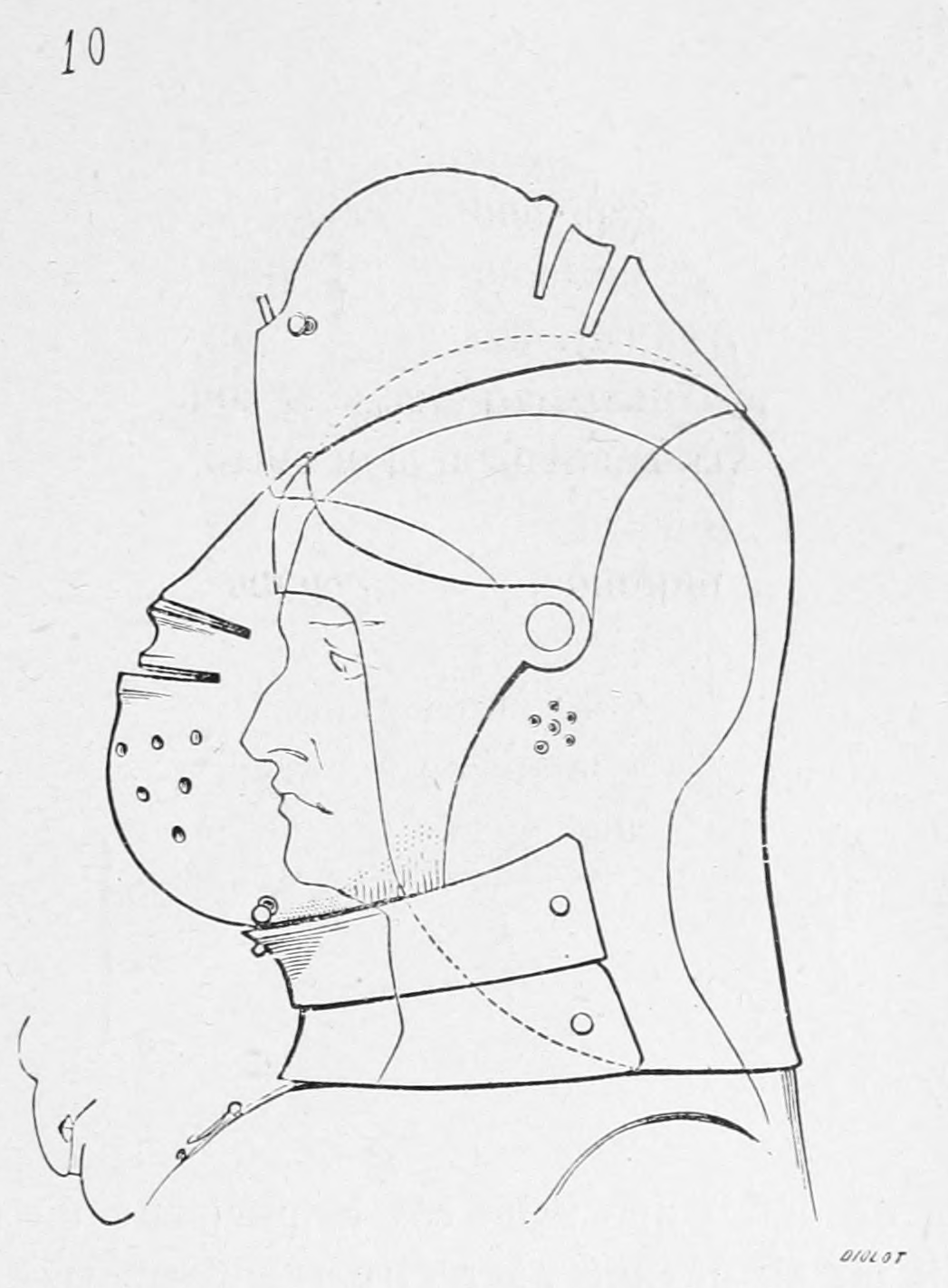
Later great bascinet (c. 1440) with rounded skull and visor, showing the position of the wearer's head and the rotation of the visor

In the view of Oakeshott the replacement of the camail by a plate gorget gave rise to the form of helmet known as the "great bascinet". Many other scholars consider that the term should be reserved for bascinets where the skull, and baviere – if present, was fixed to the gorget, rendering the whole helmet immobile.

Early gorgets were wide, copying the shape of the earlier aventail, however, with the narrowing of the neck opening the gorget plates had to be hinged to allow the helmet to be put on. Early great bascinets had the skull of the helmet riveted to the rear gorget plate, however, some later great bascinets had the skull forged in a single piece with the rear gorget plate. The gorget was often strapped to both the breast and backplate of the cuirass. In this late form the head was relieved of the entire weight of the helmet, which rested on the shoulders; however, the helmet was rendered totally immobile and the head of the wearer had only limited abilities to move inside it. Though very strongly constructed, this type of helmet imposed limitations on the wearer's vision and agility.

== Historic use ==
=== Use with the great helm ===
Bascinets, other than great bascinets, could be worn beneath a great helm. However, only those without face protection, or those with the close fitting bretache, could be worn in this manner. The great helm afforded a high degree of protection, but at the cost of very restricted vision and agility. The lighter types of bascinet gave less protection but allowed greater freedom of movement and better vision. The practicality of a man-at-arms being able to take off a great helm during a battle, if he wanted to continue fighting wearing just a bascinet, is unclear. By the mid 14th century the great helm was probably largely relegated to tournament use. However, Henry V of England is reputed to have worn a great helm over a bascinet at the Battle of Agincourt in 1415. He was recorded as receiving a blow to the head during the battle, which damaged his helmet; the double protection afforded by wearing two helmets may have saved his life.

=== Later use ===
By the middle of the 14th century, most knights had discarded the great helm altogether in favor of a fully visored bascinet. The bascinet, both with and without a visor, was the most common helmet worn in Europe during most of the 14th century and the first half of the 15th century, including during the Hundred Years' War. Contemporary illustrations show a majority of knights and men-at-arms wearing one of a few variants of the bascinet helmet. Indeed, so ubiquitous was the use of the helmet that "bascinet" became an alternative term for a man-at-arms. Though primarily associated with use by the "knightly" classes and other men-at-arms some infantry also made use of the lighter versions of this helmet. Regions where rich citizens were fielded as infantry, such as Italy, and other lands producing specialised professional infantry such as the English and Welsh longbowman probably saw the greatest use of bascinets by infantrymen.

The basic design of the earlier, conical version of the helmet was intended to direct blows from weapons downward and away from the skull and face of the wearer. Later versions of the bascinet, especially the great bascinet, were designed to maximise coverage and therefore protection. In achieving this they sacrificed the mobility and comfort of the wearer; thus, ironically, returning to the situation that the wearers of the cumbersome great helm experienced and that the early bascinets were designed to overcome. It is thought that poorer men-at-arms continued to employ lighter bascinets with mail camails long after the richest had adopted plate gorgets.

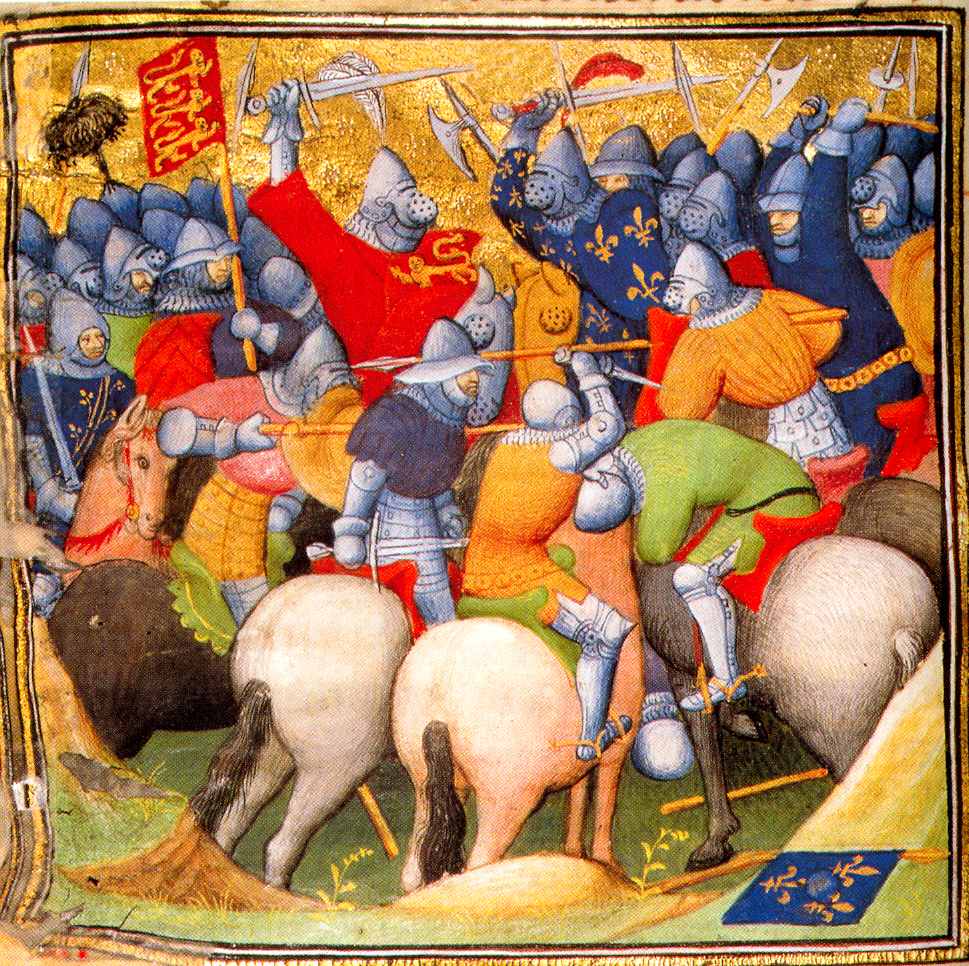
Illustration from a 15th-century manuscript showing horsemen wearing bascinets with the rounded visor used from c. 1410

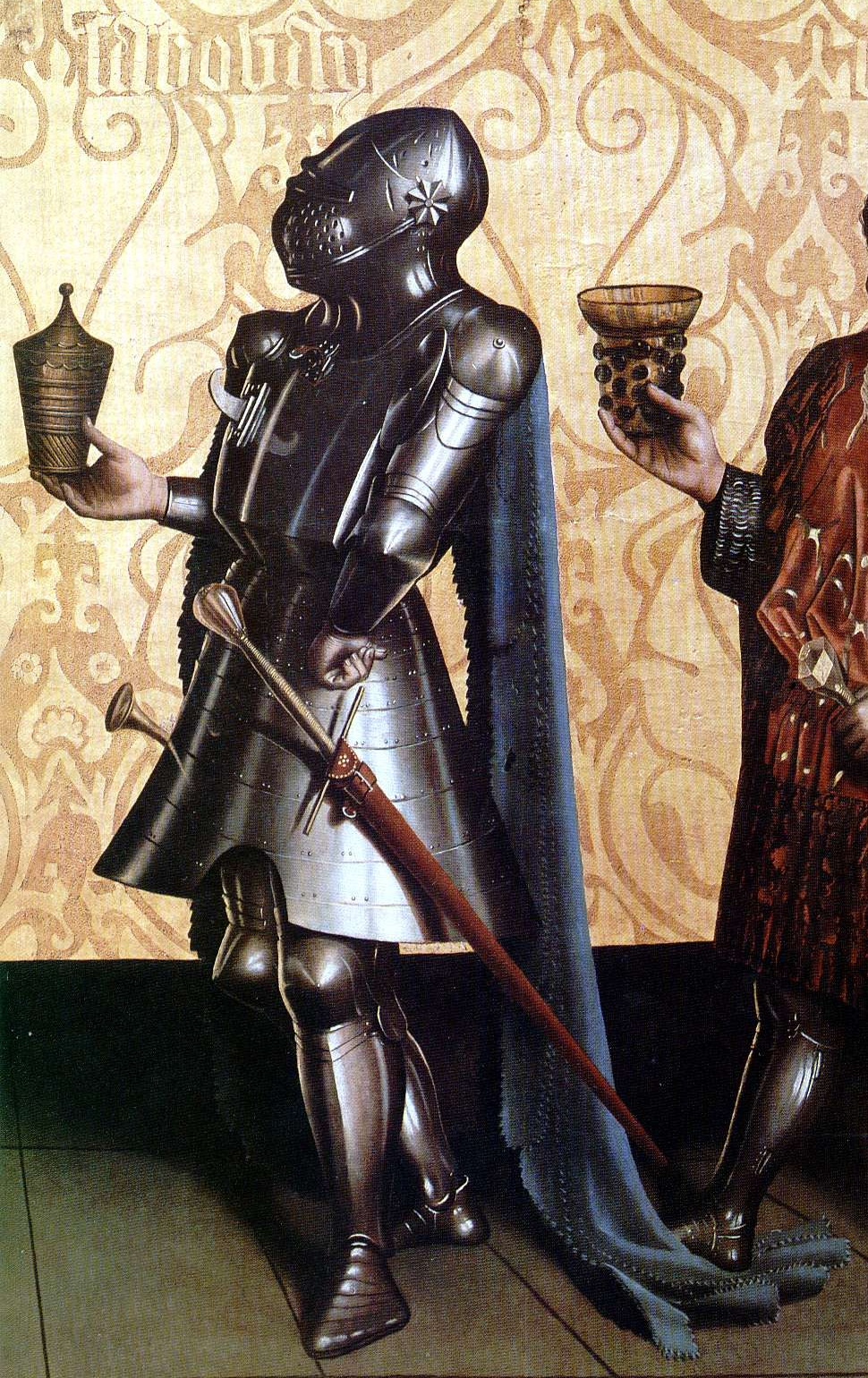
Knight wearing a great bascinet. The strap fixing the helmet to the breastplate is visible as is the impossibility of rotating the helmet. German painting by Konrad Witz, 1435

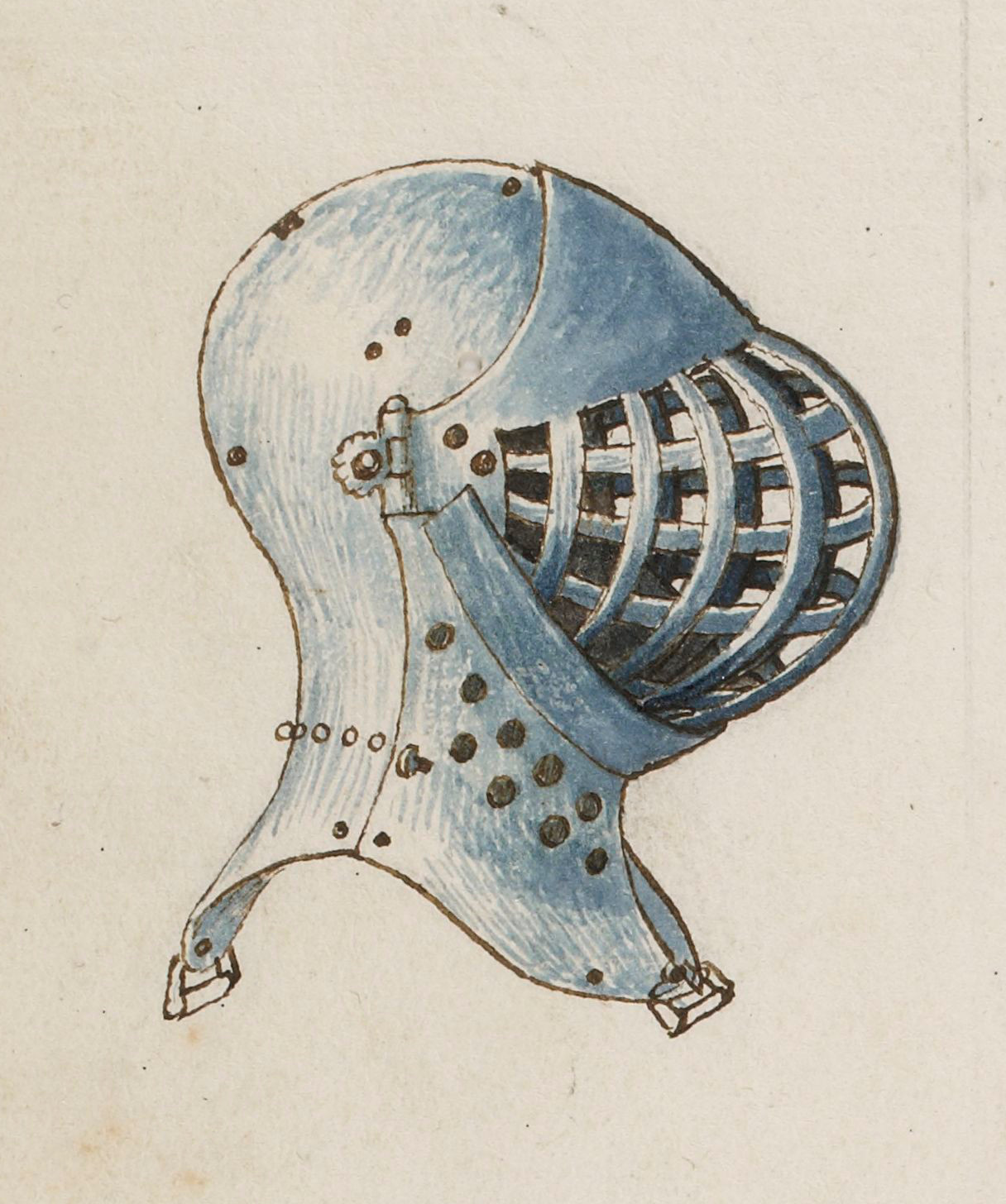
A late-period great bascinet for tournament use. The skull and back gorget are formed in one piece, and there are strapping points to secure the helmet to the cuirass.

=== Decline in use ===
Soon after 1450 the "great bascinet" was rapidly discarded for field use, being replaced by the armet and sallet, which were lighter helmets allowing greater freedom of movement for the wearer. However, a version of the great bascinet, usually with a cage-like visor, remained in use for foot combat in tournaments into the 16th century.

== General bibliography ==
- Bennett, Matthew (1991). Agincourt 1415: Triumph Against the Odds. Osprey Publishing.
- Boeheim, Wendelin (1890). Handbuch der Waffenkunde. Leipzig: Verlag von E. A. Seemann. p. 34.
- Bradbury, Jim (2004). "14 Medieval Armour (A–Z of terms: Aventail ~ Bascinet)". The Routledge Companion to Medieval Warfare. Routledge. pp. 261–262. ISBN 9780203644669.
- DeVries, Kelly and Smith, Robert Douglas (2007). Medieval Weapons: An Illustrated History of Their Impact. ABC-CLIO, Santa Barbara, CA.
- Gravett, Christopher (2008). Knight: Noble Warrior of England 1200–1600. Osprey Publishing.
- Gravett, Christopher (2002) English Medieval Knight, 1300–1400. Osprey Publishing. ISBN 1-84176-145-1.
- Gravett, Christopher (1985). German Medieval Armies: 1300–1500. Osprey Publishing.
- Lucchini, Francesco (2011). "Face, Counterface, Counterfeit: The Lost Silver Visage of the Reliquary of St. Anthony's Jawbone". Published in Meaning in Motion: Semantics of Movement in Medieval Art and Architecture, edited by N. Zchomelidse and G. Freni. Princeton.
- Miller, Douglas (1979). The Swiss at War 1300–1500. Osprey Publishing.
- Nicolle, David (1983). Italian Medieval Armies: 1300–1500. Osprey Publishing.
- Nicolle, David (1999). Arms and Armour of the Crusading Era, 1050–1350: Western Europe and the Crusader States. Greenhill Books.
- Nicolle, David (July 1999). "Medieval Warfare: The Unfriendly Interface". The Journal of Military History, Vol. 63, No. 3. pp. 579–599. Published by: Society for Military History.
- Nicolle, David (1996). Knight of Outremer, 1187–1344. Osprey Publishing.
- Nicolle, David (2000). French Armies of the Hundred Years War. Osprey Publishing.
- Oakeshott, Ewart (1980). European Weapons and Armour: From the Renaissance to the Industrial Revolution. Lutterworth Press.
- Rothero, Christopher (1981). The Armies of Agincourt. Osprey Publishing.
- Singman, J.; and McLean, W. (1999). Daily Life in Chaucer's England. Greenwood Press. ISBN 0-313-29375-9.
- Wise, Terrence (1975). "Helmet". Medieval European Armies. Osprey Publishing. pp. 15–19. ISBN 9780850452457.
- Peterson, Harold Leslie (1968). "Helmet". Encyclopædia Britannica. Vol. 11. London. pp. 335–.
- Viollet-le-Duc, Eugène Emmanuel (1874). "Bascinet". Encyclopaedia Dictionnaire raisonné du mobilier français. Vol. 5. Paris: V. A. Morel. p. 157.
- Viollet-le-Duc, Eugène Emmanuel (1875). "Heaume". Encyclopaedia Dictionnaire raisonné du mobilier français. Vol. 6. Paris: V. A. Morel. p. 118.
