= Zerwikaptur coat of arms =

Polish coat of arms

Zerwikaptur
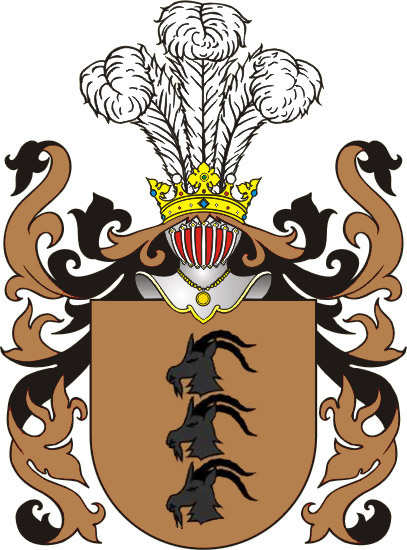
- Alternative name: Koziegłowy
- Earliest mention: Unknown
- Towns: None
- Families: Bionetowski, Cieszkiewicz, Cieszkowski, Dobrogwil, Kozieglowski, Minolganski, Pasiowski, Podbipieta, Pollupieta, Zbigwicz, Zerwikaptur,

Zerwikaptur is a Polish coat of arms. It was used by several gentry families in the times of the Polish–Lithuanian Commonwealth.

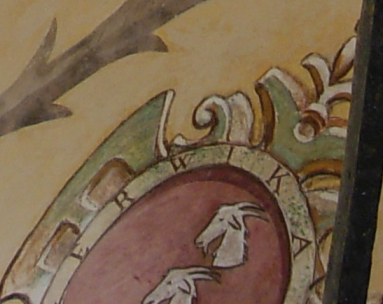
Zerwikaptur coat of arms in Baranow-Sandomierski castle

A legend about the origination of the coat of arms is used in the novel With Fire and Sword by Henryk Sienkiewicz, whereby a character Longinus Podbipięta managed to cut off the heads of three knights bearing the goat's head on their arms with a single swing of his huge sword. Therefore he named his sword "Zerwikaptur", literally meaning "coif-snapper", and later got the coat of arms of this name. In fact, Zerwikaptur originated well before the times of the novel.

== See also ==
- Polish heraldry
