= Cervelliere =

Hemispherical, close-fitting skull cap of steel or iron

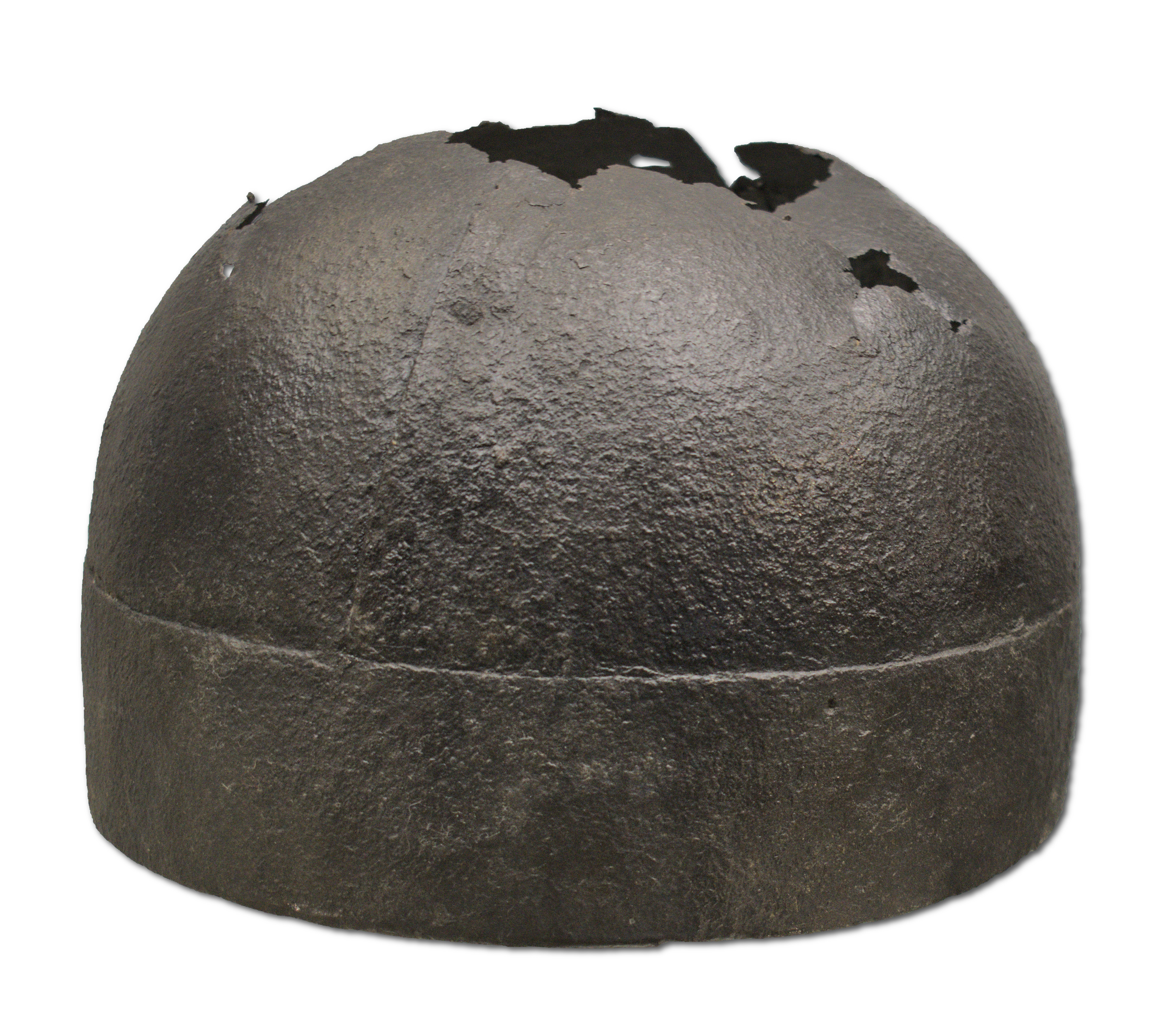
Early cervelliere (11–12th century)

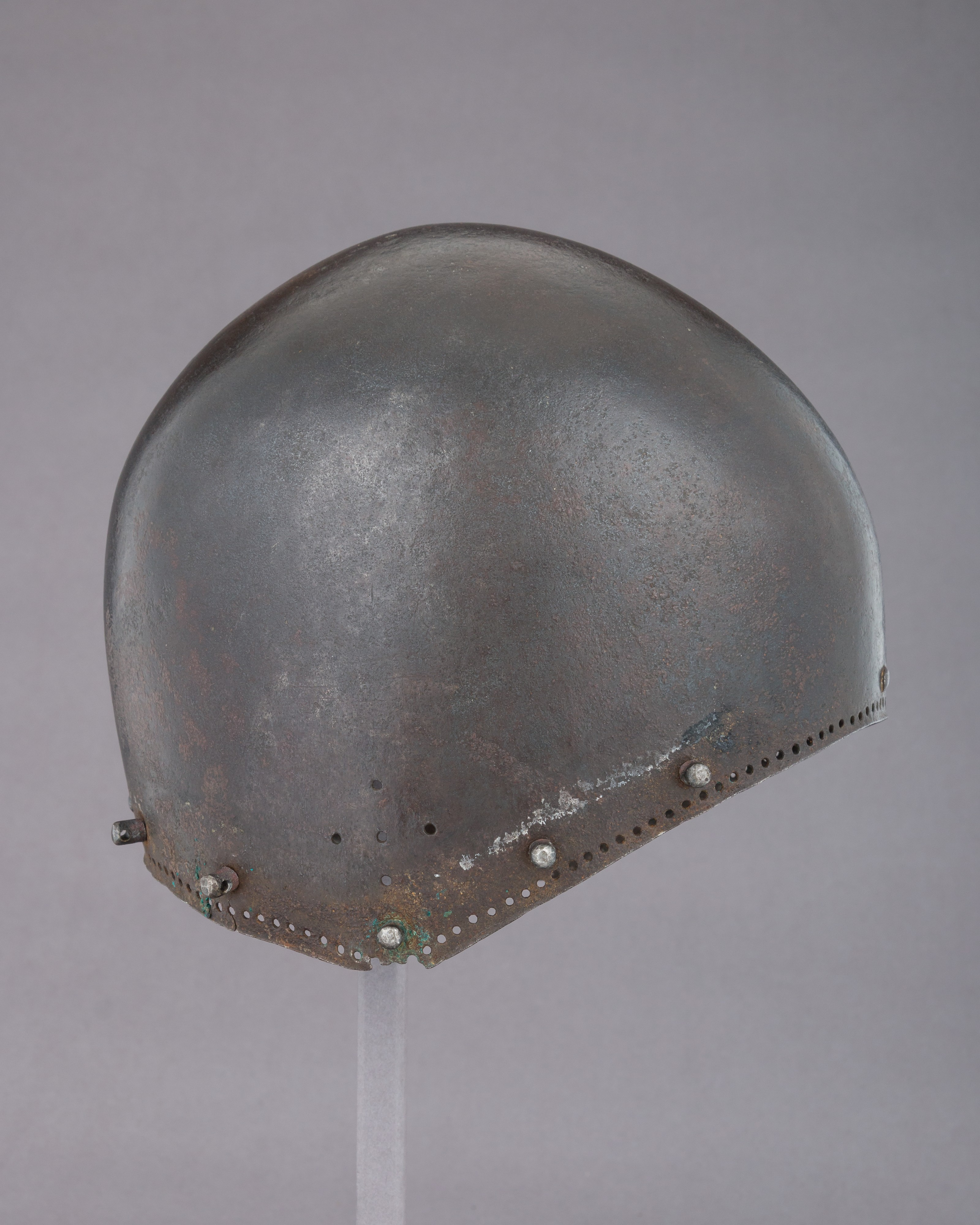
Late cervelliere (14th century), also included as early form of bascinet

A cervelliere (cervelière, cervelliera; Latin: cervellerium, cerebrarium, cerebrerium, cerebotarium) is a hemispherical, close-fitting skull cap of steel or iron. It was worn as a helmet during the medieval period and a version known as a secret was worn under felt hats during the Wars of the Three Kingdoms in the early modern period.

== Etymology ==
Cervelliere is a French mutation from the Latin forms cervellerium or cerebrarium. This can be approximately translated as "brain keeper", from cerebrum (brain) and the suffix -arium the suffix -arium (storage location)

== History ==
The cervelliere was first introduced during the late 12th century. It was worn either alone or more often over or under a mail coif. Additionally, a great helm could be worn over a cervelliere, and by the late 13th century this was the usual practice.

Over time, the cervelliere experienced several evolutions. Many helmets became increasingly pointed and the back of the skull cap elongated to cover the neck, thus developing into the bascinet. Cervellieres were worn throughout the medieval period and even during the Renaissance. They were cheap and easy to produce and thus much used by commoners and non-professional soldiers who could not afford more advanced protection.

Anecdotally, medieval literature credits the invention of the cervellière to astrologer Michael Scot c. 1233, though this is not seriously entertained by most historians. The Chronicon Nonantulanum (Note: Planché gives Nantubanum but Nonantulanum is given by Du Cange) records that the astrologer devised the iron-plate cap shortly before his own predicted death, which he still inevitably met when a stone weighing two ounces fell on his protected head.
