= Aventail =

Flexible curtain of mail attached to the skull of a helmet

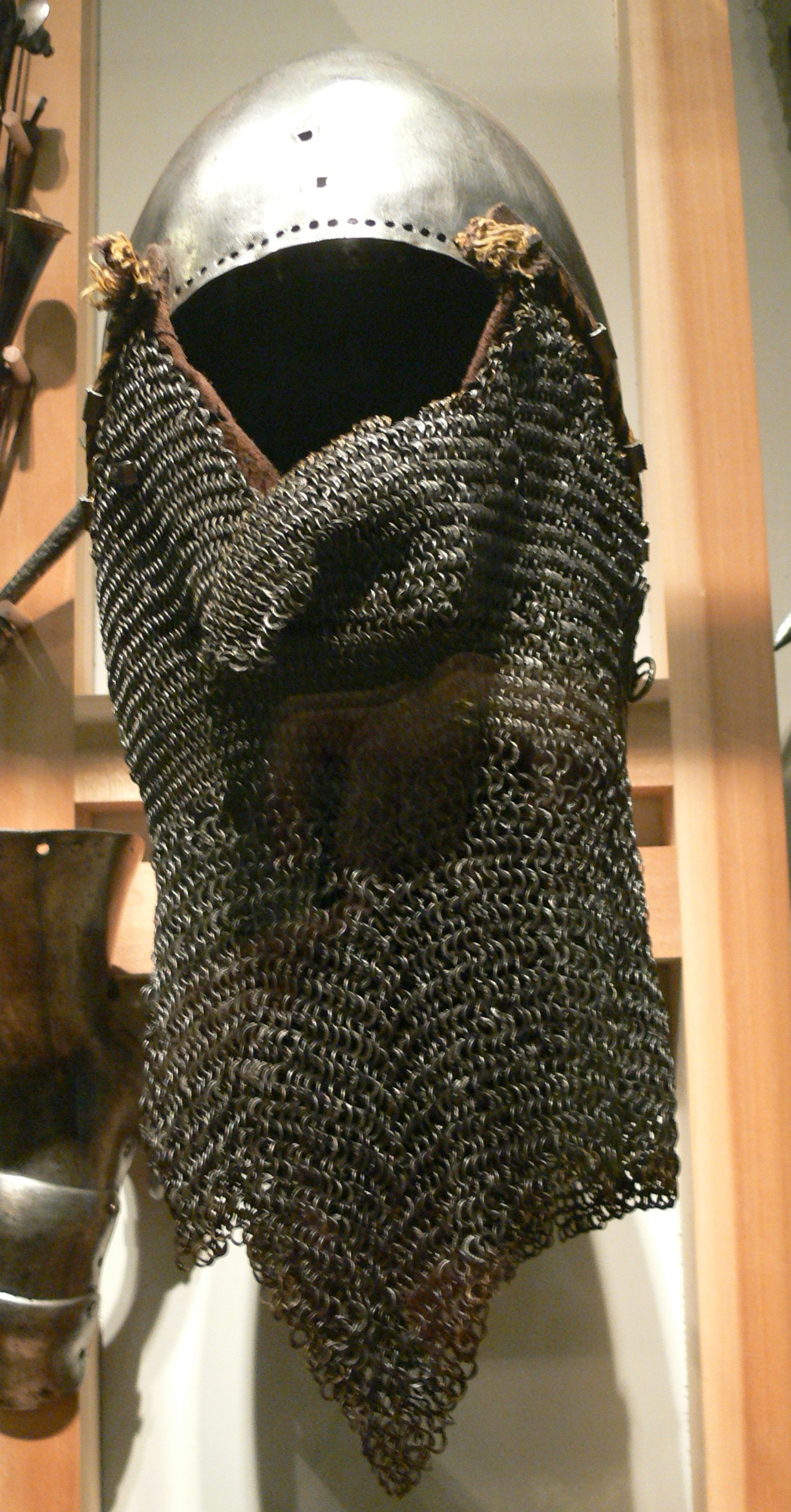
Camail with triangle ventail (mail flap) on a bascinet (ca. 1360) at the German Historical Museum.

An aventail (/ˈævənteɪl/) or camail (/kəˈmeɪl, ˈkæmeɪl/) is armour consisting of a flexible curtain of mail attached to the lower part of a helmet that extends protection to cover at least the back and sides of the neck. Parts of the face, throat, and shoulders could also be covered, with spaces to allow for vision. Some featured a ventail (a mail flap next to the mouth), which could be laced or hooked up to cover the lower face, or left loose to facilitate breathing and speech.

== European history ==
=== Early and High Middle Ages ===
Aventails of chain mail started appearing on Northern European helmets as early as the 6th century, as seen on several Vendel Era helmets, most notably the Valsgärde 8 helmet (580–630 AD) from Uppsala, Sweden, but also the well preserved Coppergate Helmet (ca. 750–800 AD) from York, England. These early appearances varied greatly in configuration, the Valsgärde 8 helmet featuring an aventail which enclosed the entire lower face, throat and neck, versus the Coppergate Helmet, which combines hanging cheek guards with an aventail for the neck (a configuration likely also used on the similar 7th century Anglo-Saxon Pioneer Helmet).

Byzantine helmets also sometimes show evidence of mail aventails. A rare find of a helmet in Yasenovo in Bulgaria, dating to the 10th century, may represent an example of a distinctively Byzantine style. This rounded helmet has a brow-band pierced for the attachment of a face-covering camail.

The enclosed Vendel style aventail came to be the most conventional type going forward into the High Middle Ages. Some configurations fixed the frontal aventail to a spectacle visor (upper face mask) like the Vendel 8 helmet or a nasal guard, notably seen on several Rus' and Kievan Rus' high medieval helmets. Other configurations let the aventail hang loose in front of or under the face like a veil, most likely with an inner liner against chafing or padding against blows. A reason to not connect the frontal mail to a spectacle visor or nasal guard might have been to allow for a ventail, a flap of mail which allowed the user to open and close the mail over the mouth for added flexibility. Archeological finds of complete aventails from the early medieval period are however sparse and more than often only a few perforated attachment holes remain.

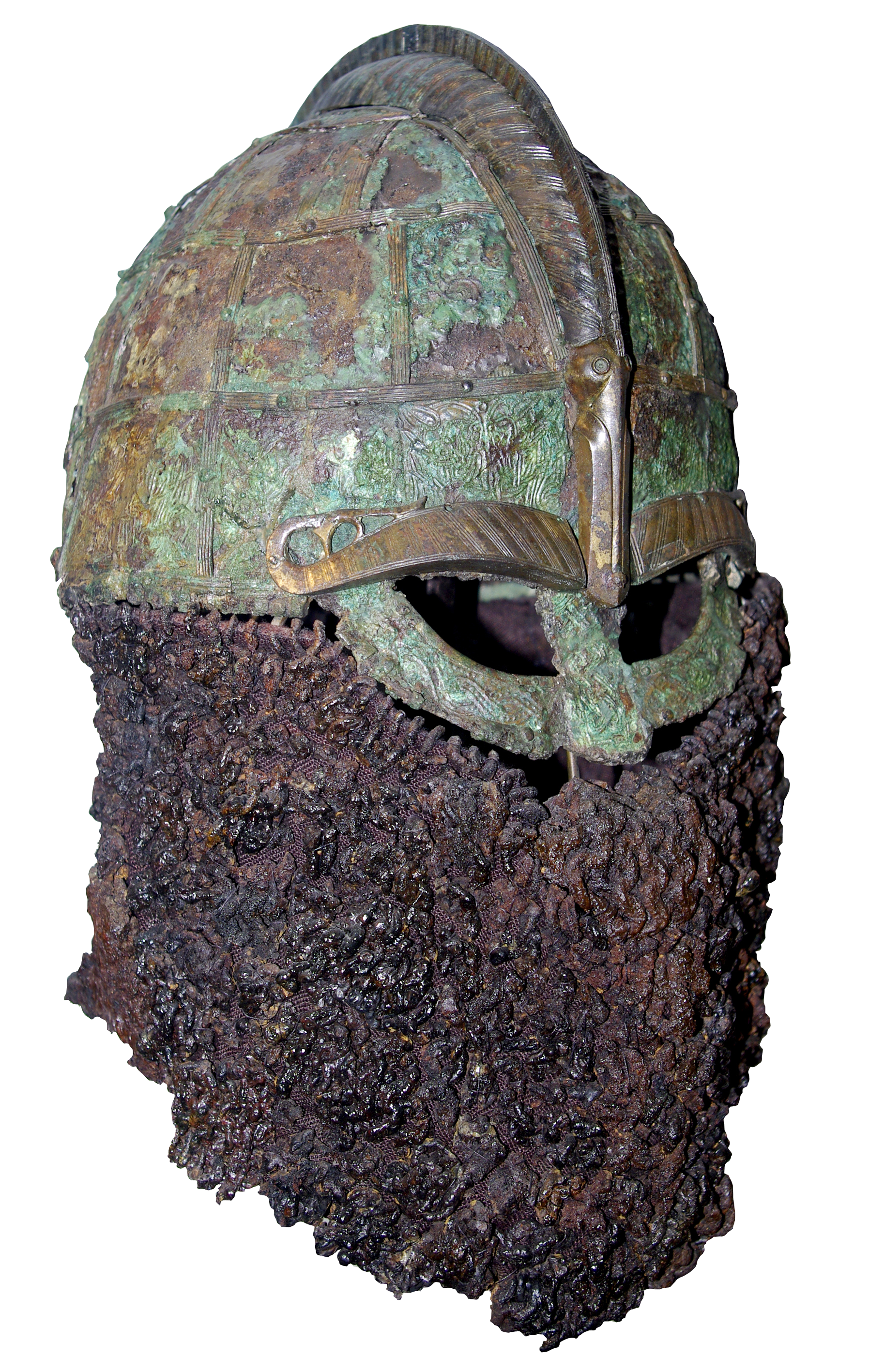
Valsgärde 8 helmet (580–630 AD) with an enclosed aventail fixed to the visor

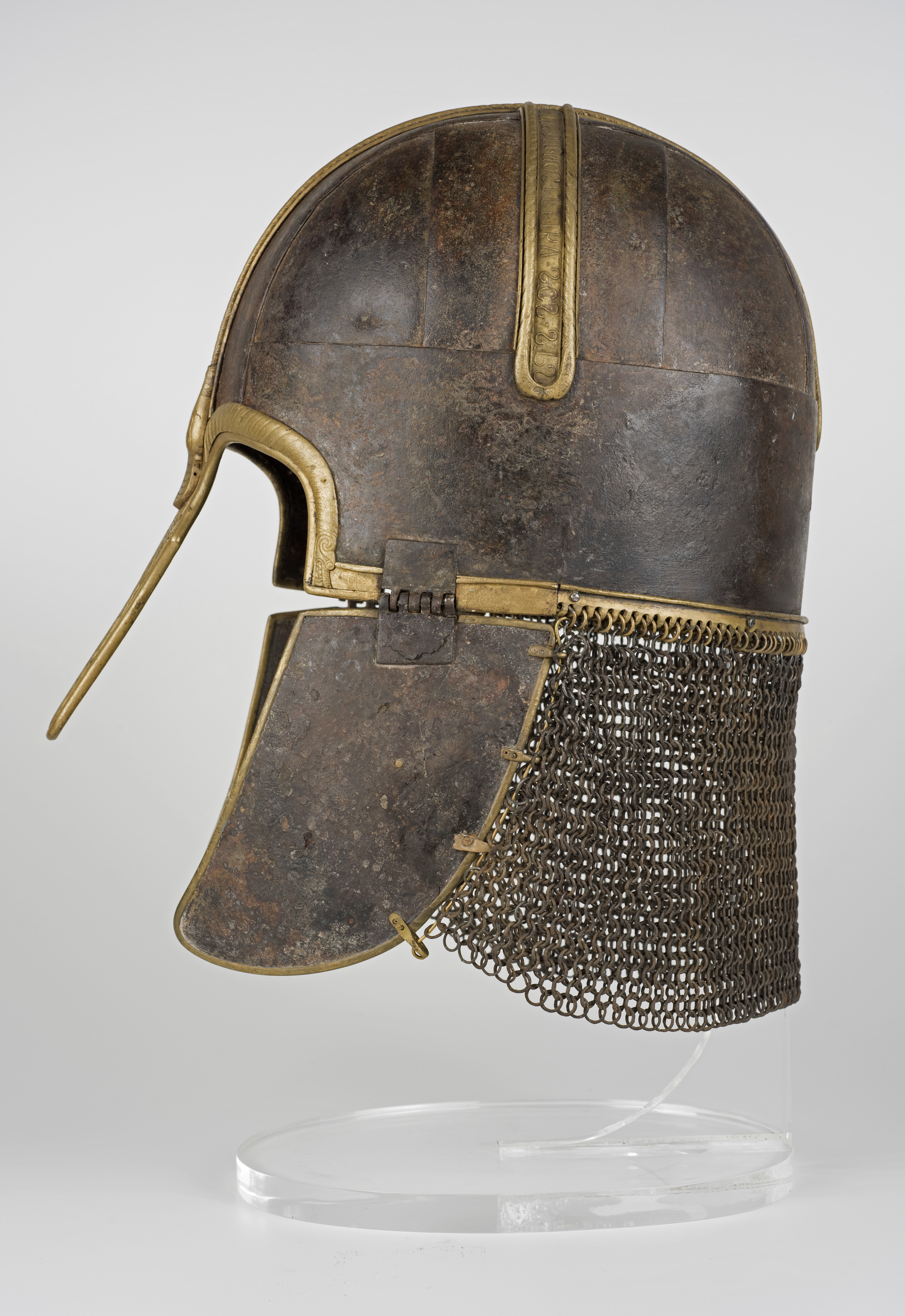
Coppergate Helmet (ca. 750–800) with a neck aventail combined with cheek guards

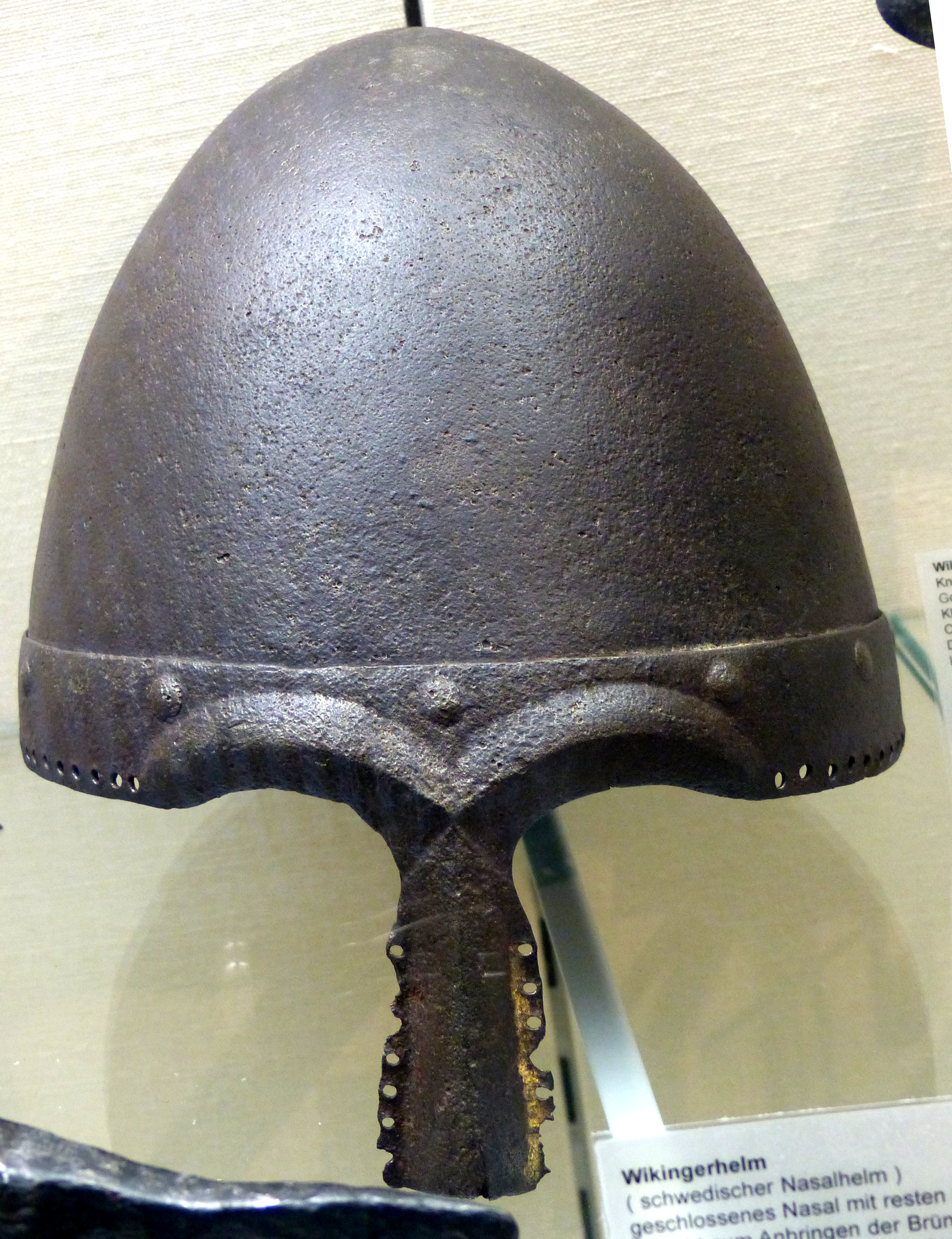
Rus' nasal helm (11th century) with perforated nose guard for an enclosed aventail

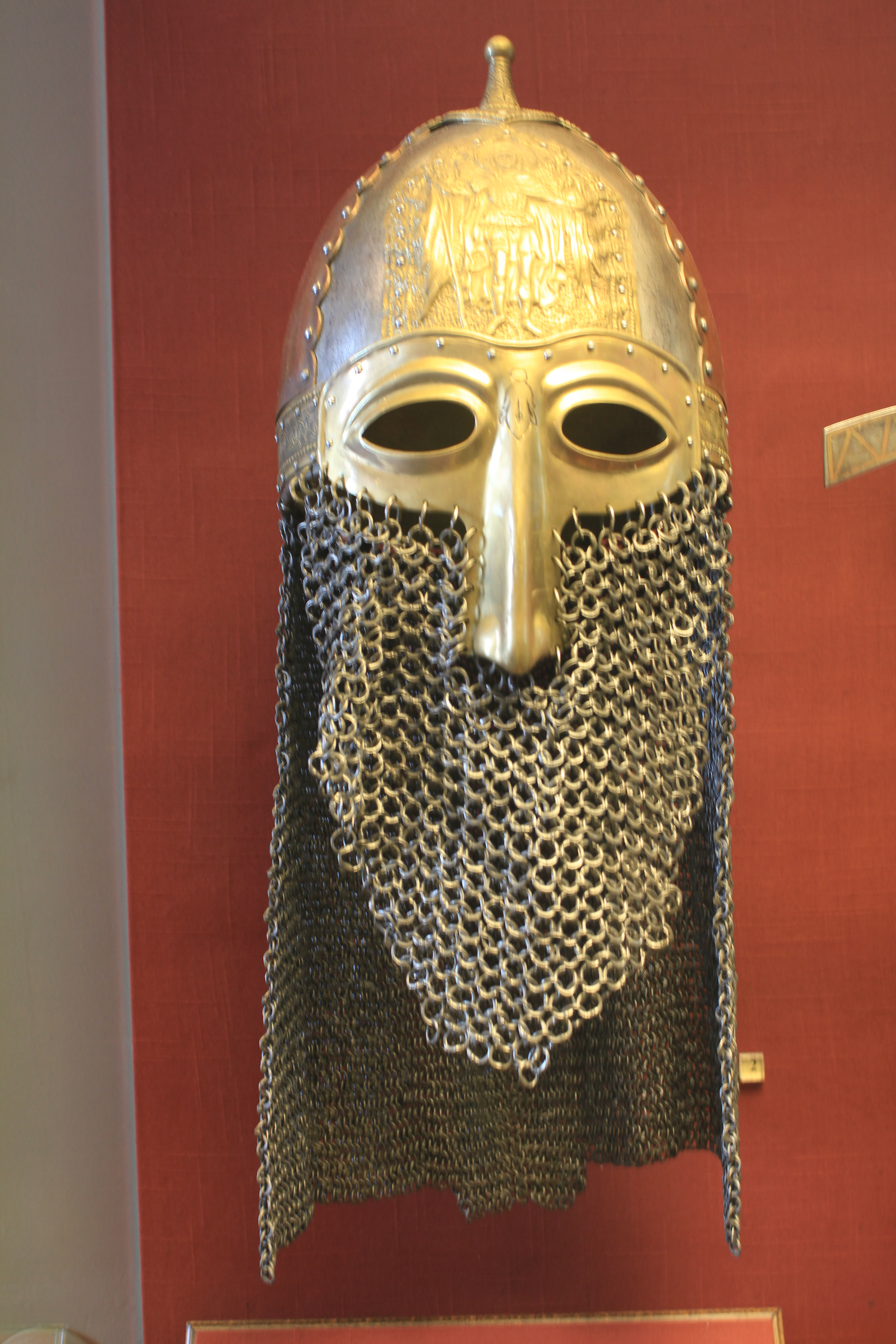
Kievan Rus' modern reproduction spectacle helmet (1150–1250) with aventail fixed to the visor

=== Later Middle Ages ===
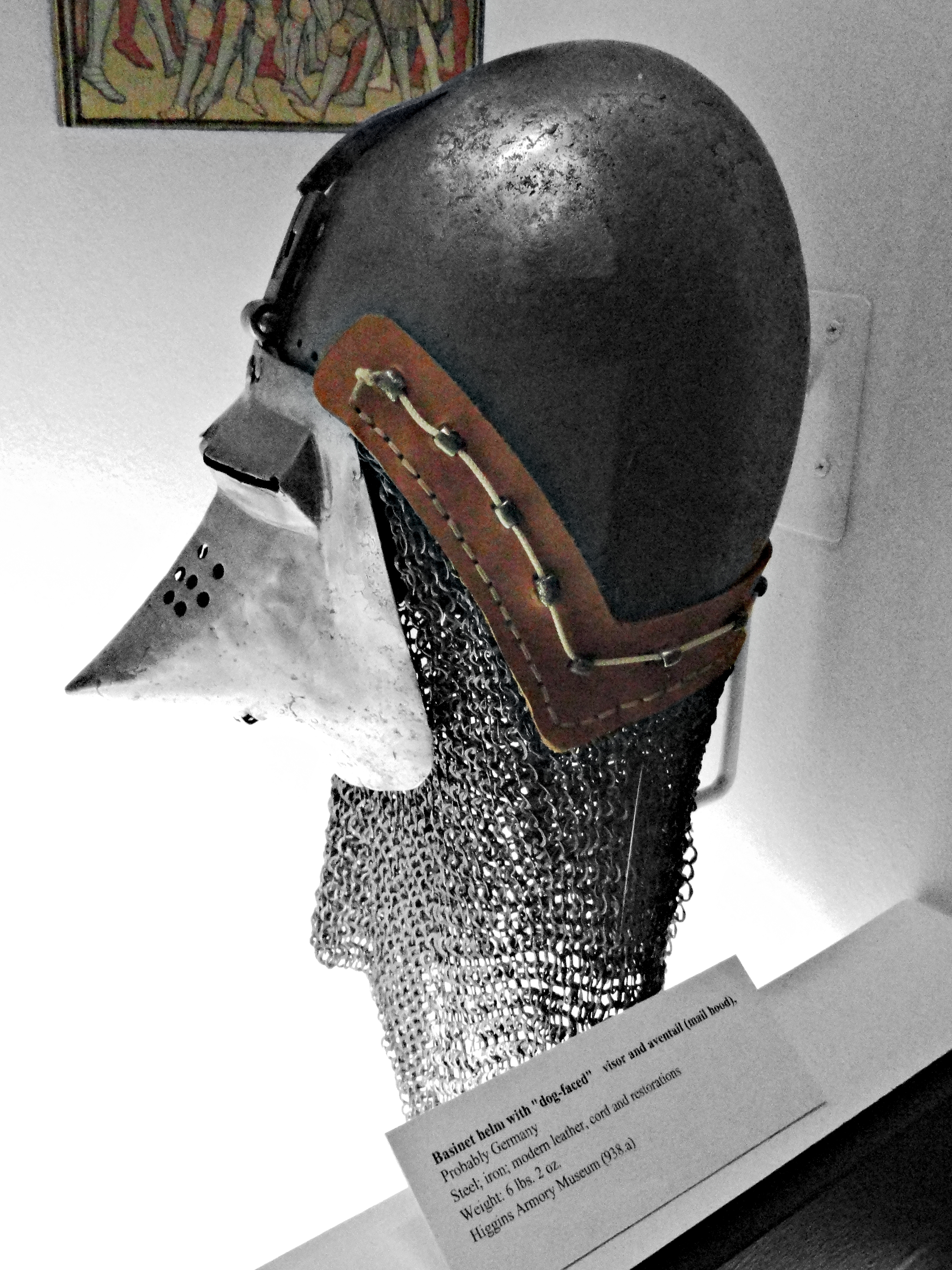
Detachable aventail on a hounskull bascinet

Early aventails were riveted or otherwise fixed directly to the edge of the helmet, however, beginning in the 1320s in Western Europe, a detachable version replaced this type. The detachable aventail was attached to a leather band, which was in turn attached to the lower border of the helmet by a series of pierced rivets, called vervelles. Holes in the leather band were passed over the vervelles, and a waxed cord was passed through the holes in the vervelles to secure it.

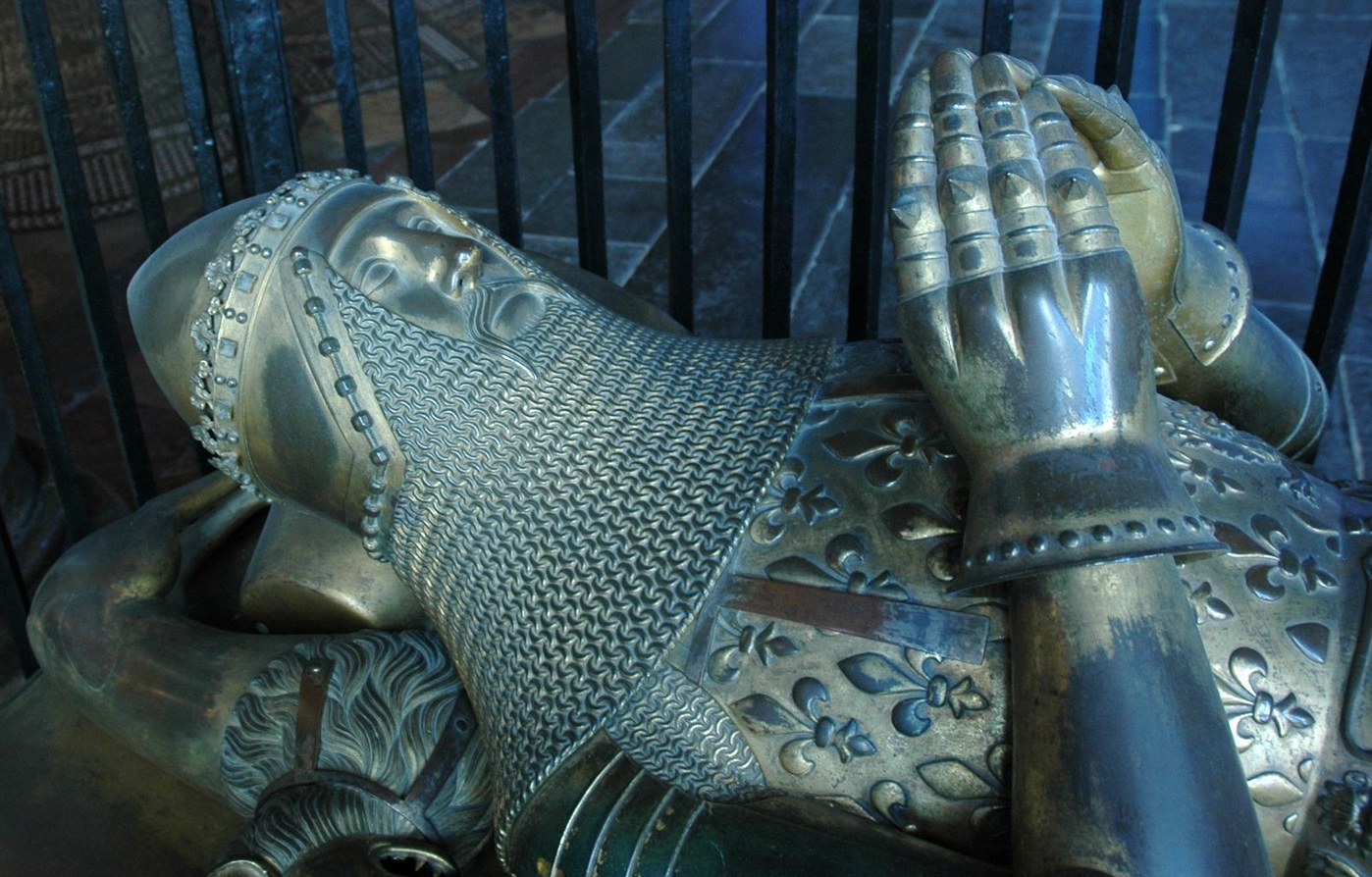
Historic depiction of a bascinet with aventail on the tomb of Edward, the Black Prince (1376)

Aventails were commonly seen on bascinets in the 14th century and served as a replacement for a complete mail hood (coif). Some aventails were decorated with edging in brass or bronze links (sometimes gilded), or with a zig-zag lower edge (vandyked). By the mid 14th century, the aventail had replaced the mail coif completely. By the dawn of the 15th century, the plate armored neck guard (gorget) of the Great Bascinet started to replace the aventail.

== Bibliography ==
- Gravett, Christopher (2008). Knight: Noble Warrior of England 1200–1600. Osprey Publishing.
- Dawson, Timothy (2007). Byzantine Infantryman. Eastern Roman Empire c.900–1204. Osprey, Oxford. ISBN 978-1-84603-105-2.
- Tweddle, Dominic (1992). The Anglian Helmet from 16–22 Coppergate. The Archaeology of York. Vol. 17/8. London: Council for British Archaeology. ISBN 1-872414-19-2. Archived from the original on 21 March 2024.
