= Mail coif =

Chainmail covering for the head and neck

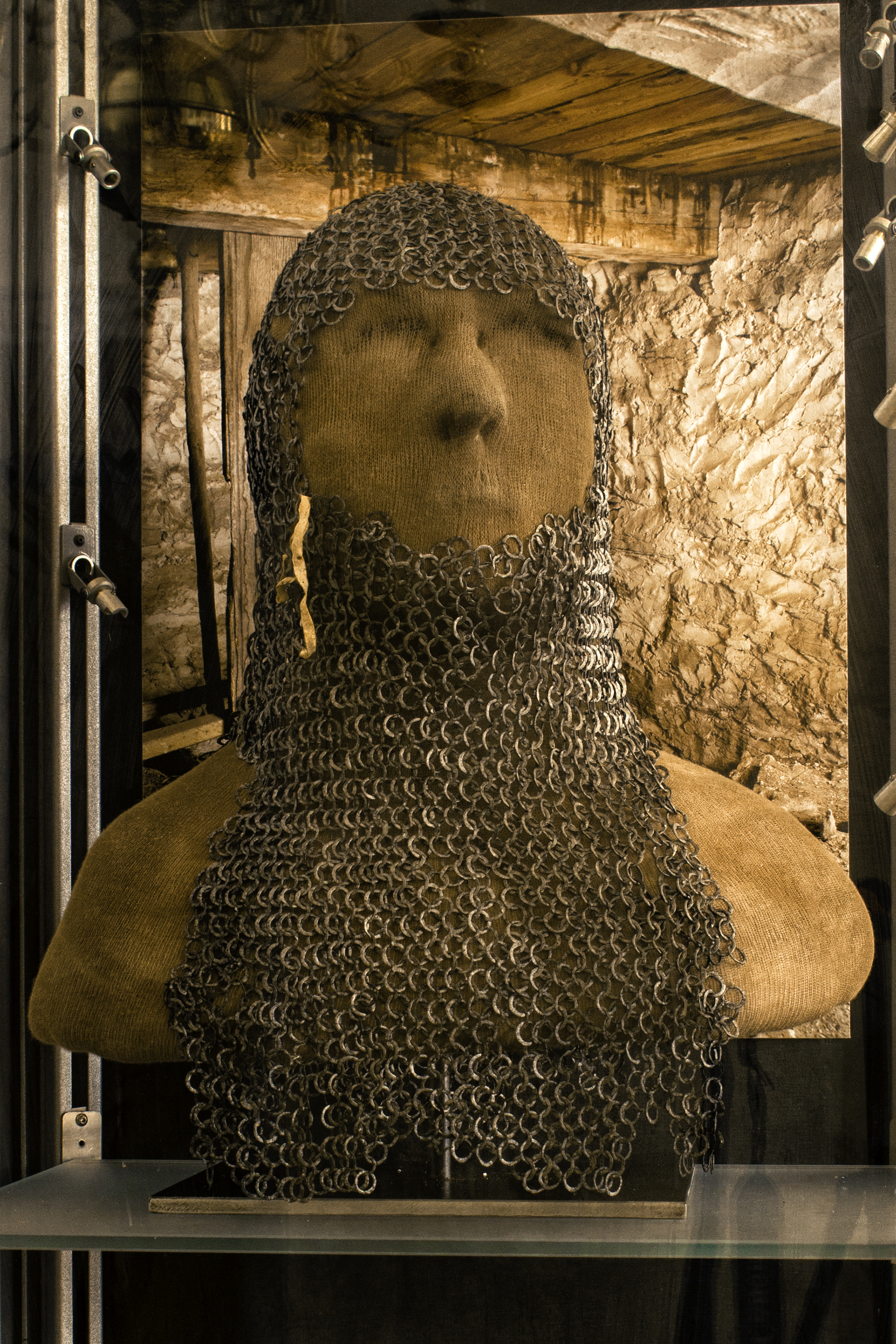
13th century separate mail coif from Tofta Church, Gotland.

A mail coif, a type of armour, covered the head. It consisted of a flexible hood of chain mail, extending to cover the throat, neck, and the top part of the shoulders. Mail coifs protected European fighting-men of the Middle Ages.

== History ==
The coif dates from the 10th century, and is a close-fitting cap that covers the top, back, and sides of the head. It was usually made from white linen and tied under the chin. They were everyday wear for lower-class men and women from the 12th to 15th centuries.

Mail originated with the Celts in the 5th century BC. After the destruction of the Thracians by the Roman Empire, mail came back into fashion as the most common form of battlefield armour much later, during the Middle Ages among European mounted and foot soldiers until the 13th century.

== Construction ==
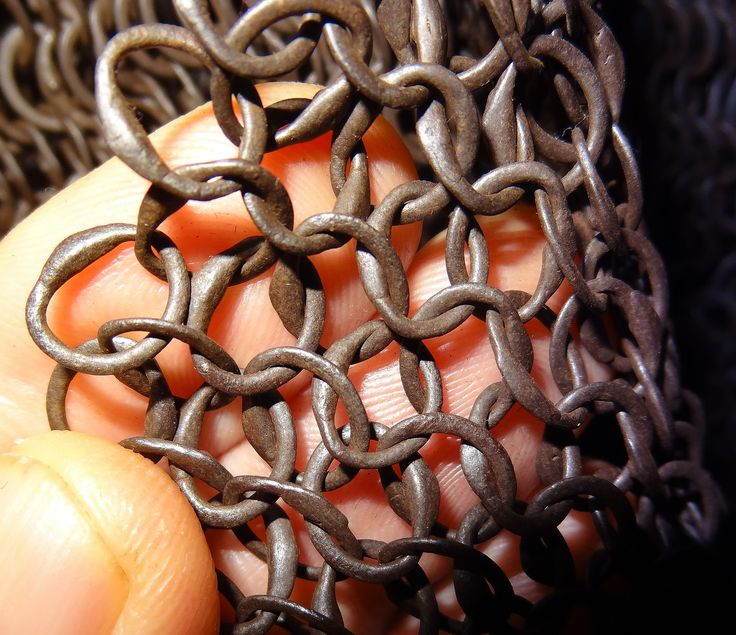
4-1 link pattern

The most common pattern of linking the rings together is the 4-to-1 pattern, where each ring is linked with four others. Historically, the rings composing a piece of mail would be riveted closed to reduce the chance of the rings splitting open when subjected to an attack. In the beginning, European mail was made of alternating rows of round riveted rings and solid rings. By the 14th century, European mail makers stopped using solid rings and mail was made from wedge riveted rings only with no solid rings.

Contrary to depiction in most media, the mail coif was never placed directly on the skull, but onto a thick shock-absorbing padding made from leather, textile, hair, etc. Increased thermal insulation led to faster overheating of the wearer, which was of major concern for armoured combat.

By the late 15th century, the aventail had replaced the mail coif completely. An aventail is a curtain of mail that is attached to the skull of a helmet. The mail extends to cover the throat, neck, and shoulders.

== Etymology ==
For the word mail, there are a variety of alternative spellings. This is a common English word introduced by the French. Generally, the English spelling has been preferred, which is mail, instead of the lately used maille or the inauthentic term chainmail.

== See also ==
- Mail (armour)
- Components of medieval armour
- Coif
- Aventail
- Hauberk

== Bibliography ==
- Gabriel, Richard A. (2007), The Ancient World, Greenwood Publishing Group
- Leventon, Melissa (2008), What People Wore When – A Complete Illustrated History of Costume from Ancient Times to the Nineteenth Century for Every Level of Society, St Martin’s Griffin, New York: The Ivy Press Limited
- Richardson, T. (2011), "Armour in England, 1325–99", Journal of Medieval History, 37 (3): 304–320, doi:10.1016/j.jmedhist.2011.06.001, S2CID 162329279.
- Webber, Christopher (2011), The gods of battle : the Thracians at war, 1500 BC - AD 150, Barnsley, South Yorkshire: Pen & Sword Military, ISBN 978-1-84415-835-5
