= Orle (helmet decoration) =

Decorative wreath in Western Europe

The orle was a decorative chaplet or wreath worn on helmets in Western Europe during the first half of the 15th century. There is a level of overlap of function and appearance with the torse, though the latter term implies a twisted pad made up of, usually, two contrasting colours of cloth.

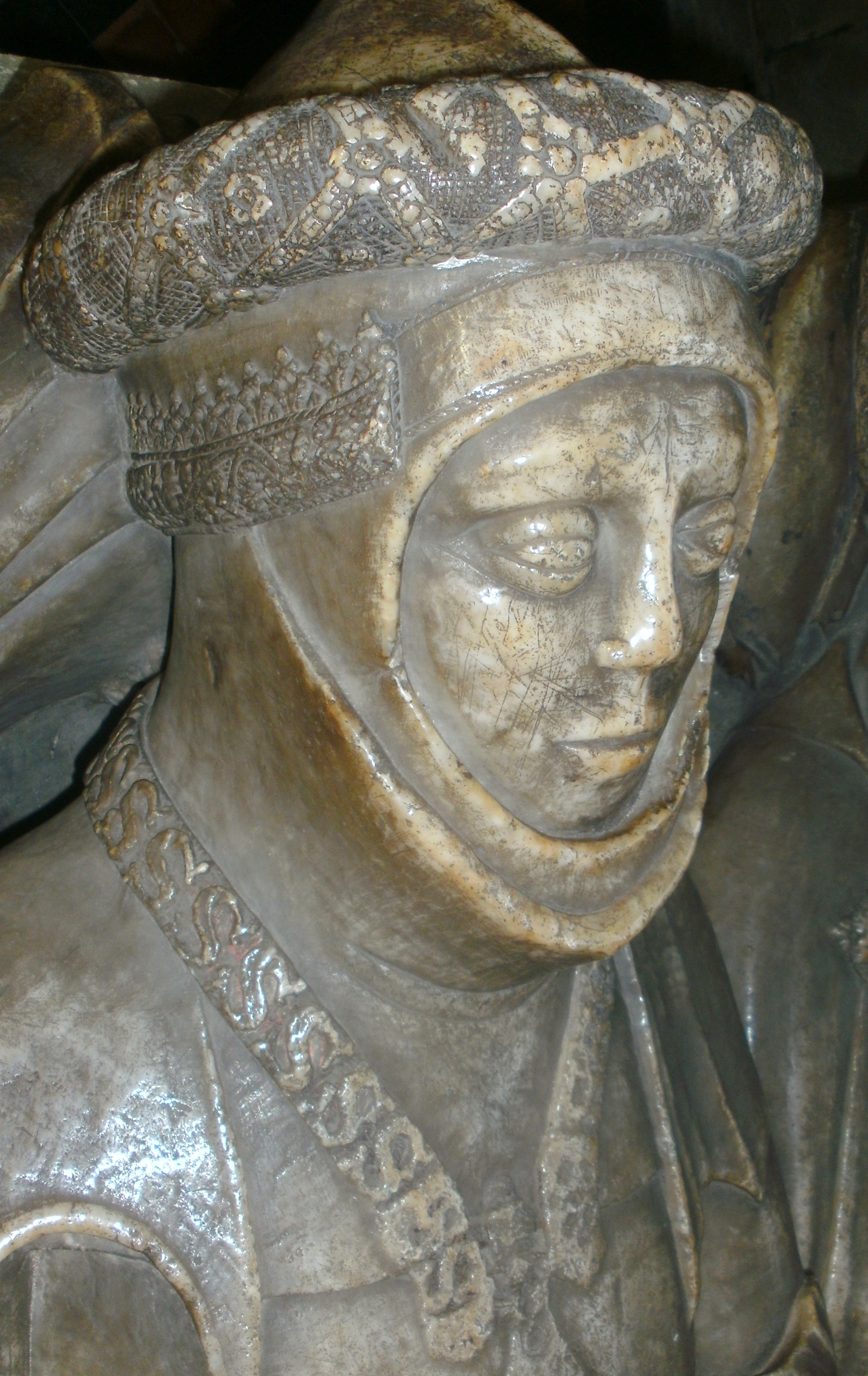
A sculpture depicting a decorative orle, worn on a bascinet with baviere and plate gorget, English funerary monument c. 1450 (Stafford tomb, St. John the Baptist Church, Bromsgrove)

== Development ==
The orle originated as a functional, padded roll of fabric worn around the bascinet helmet in the 14th century. In this period the bascinet was often worn under a great helm, and the orle served as a padded buffer between the two helmets. The force of any blow received on the great helm would tend to be absorbed by the orle, rather than being directly transmitted to the bascinet and the head within it. Additionally, the orle helped to keep the great helm steady on the head. Later, certainly before 1400, the bascinet was increasingly worn on its own. In the first half of the 15th century the orle developed into a purely decorative addition to the helmet. It also helped to conceal the junction of a heraldic crest with the helmet, if a crest were to be worn.

== Appearance and depiction in art ==
The later orle retained its padded, roll-like, appearance, but was made of fine woven material, silk or velvet, often incorporating bands of cloth of gold or silver. The orles of richer knights and nobles were decorated with jewels. In the manuscript depicting the life of Richard Beauchamp, Earl of Warwick the earl is described at a tournament wearing a bascinet decorated with a “chapellet rich of perle and precious stones”. The orle is relatively often represented on English sculptural tomb effigies, usually of alabaster, during the first half of the 15th century. However, it is very rarely shown on contemporary two-dimensional memorial brasses, which also depict men wearing bascinets.
