= Vervelles =

Rivets in medieval armour

Vervelles are small metal rivets used in Medieval armour to attach an aventail to a helmet. The rivet would extend out from the surface of the helmet and that extension contained a hole. A leather cord or metal wire would be strung through the vervelles in order to secure the strip of leather or metal (to which the maille aventail was attached) to the helmet.

== Gallery ==
Images of Vervelles
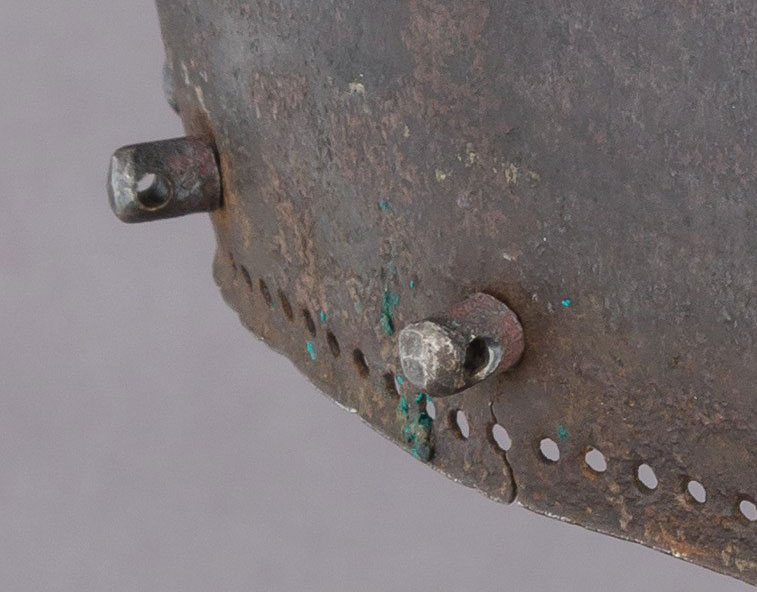
Part of a German bascinet helmet from 1325, showing the vervelles at the edge.

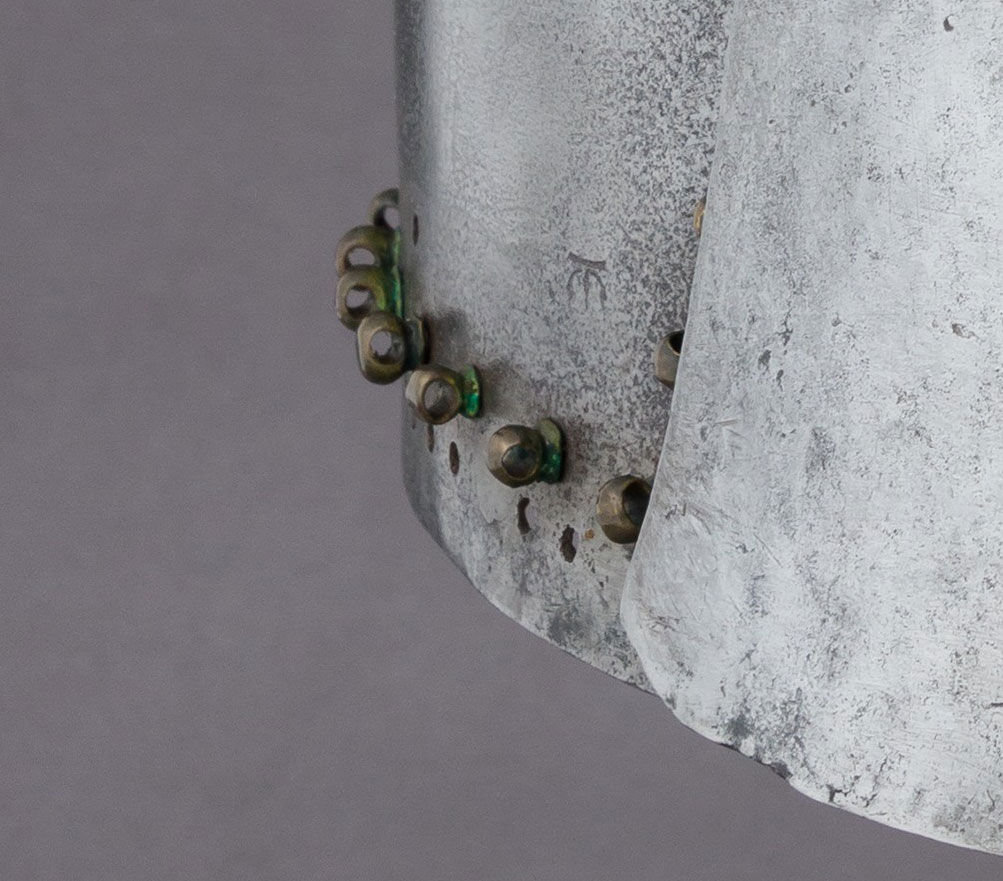
Vervelles in a German bascinet helmet from 1400.

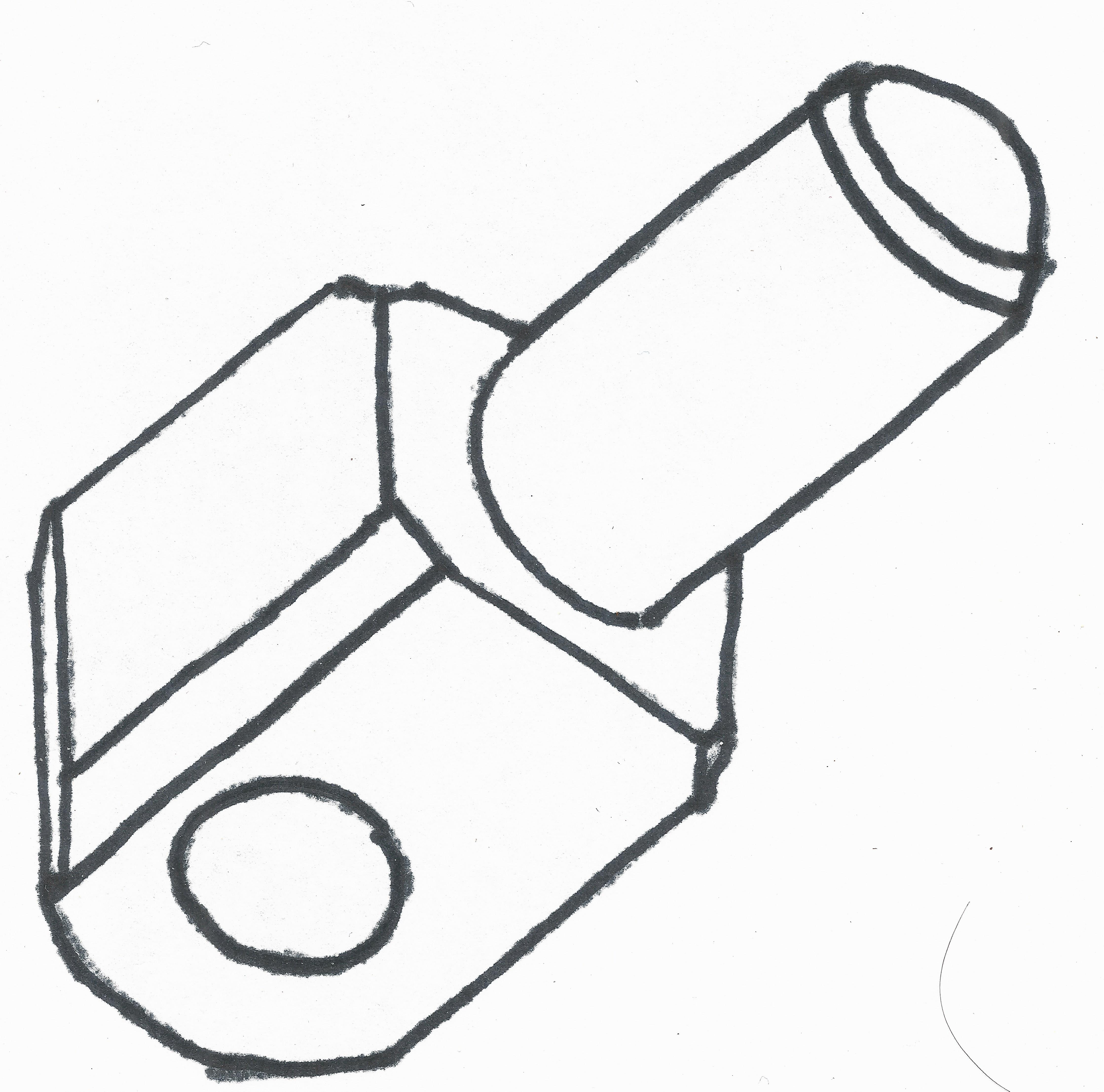
Drawing of a vervelles before attaching to helmet.

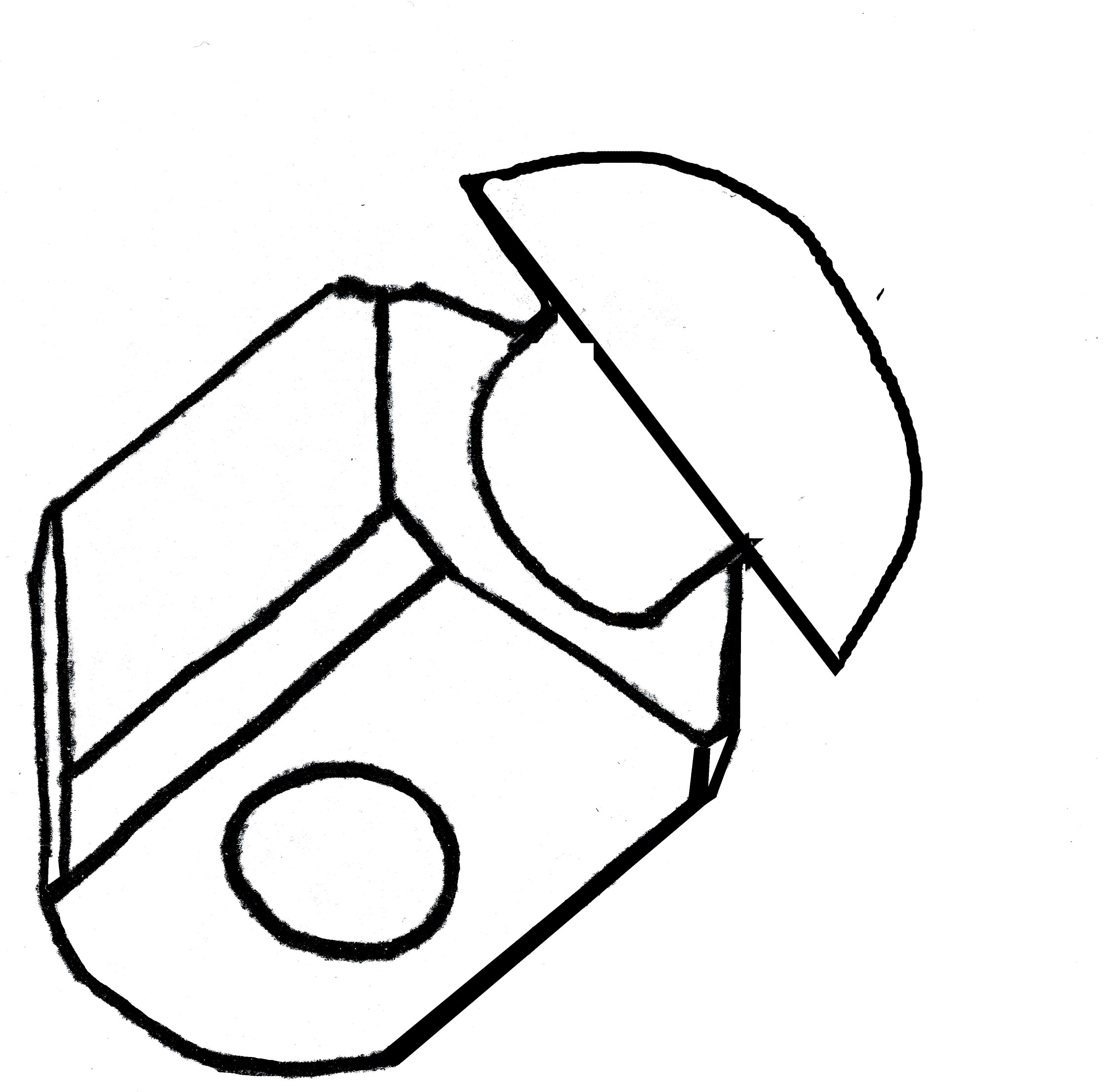
Drawing of a vervelles after attachment to helmet. The pin has been flattened into a dome, which locks it to the helmet.
Vervelles

== Bibliography ==
- Edge, David; Paddock, John Miles (1993) [1988]. Arms & Armor of the Medieval Knight (Crescent Books reprint ed.). New York: Crescent Books. ISBN 0-517-10319-2.
