= Orle, Wałcz County =

Orle
- Village
- Location within Poland Location within West Pomeranian Voivodeship
- Coordinates: 53°22′08″N 16°00′37″E
- Country: Poland
- Voivodeship: West Pomeranian
- County: Wałcz
- Gmina: Mirosławiec
- Time zone: UTC+1 (CET)
  - Summer (DST): UTC+2 (CEST)
- Postal code: 78-650
- Area code: +48 67

Orle (Polish: [ˈɔr.lɛ], from 1945 to 2002: Orla [ˈɔr.la]; German until 1945: Wordel [vœrtəl]) is a village in the West Pomeranian Voivodeship, Poland, located within the Gmina Mirosławiec, Wałcz County.
