= Sir Thomas Griffin (1323–1360) =

Sir Thomas Griffin, Knight (1323–1360) was a Knight of Weston Favell Manor and the Manor of Braybrooke, Northamptonshire, England. Thomas Griffin was the son of John Griffin (1272–1350) and Elizabeth Favell (b. 1275) Married 1316.

== Life ==
There appears to be no record of the life of Sir Thomas Griffin, however he inspired the character played by Christopher Bond in the Lion Rampant Medieval Display Society. This includes an accurate reconstruction of the armour that Sir Thomas would have used prior to his death in 1360

== Heraldry ==
Coat of arms: Griffin. Sable a griffin argent with beak and forelegs or. The family Crest is recorded as a black Talbot's (dog's) head and the family motto is Non quo, sed quo modo (Not for whom, but in what manner) and Fide Et Fortitudine (By Fidelity and Fortitude/Faithful and Courageous)

== Armour reconstruction ==
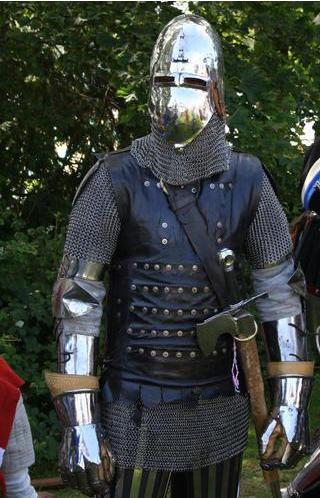
Reconstruction of Sir Thomas Griffin's Armour 1360

The reconstruction of Sir Thomas Griffin's armour circa 1360, is based research on evidence from the Battle of Visby in 1361, English effigies and monumental brass of the period. It consists of the following elements: Klappvisier bascinet with mail aventail, quilted arming cap, gambeson, mail shirt, coat of plates based on the Visby No.1 coat of plates, simple jointed arm harness, hour glass gauntlet (glove), linen hose, pair of greaves, pair of sollerets, pair of knee cops or poleyn, padded chausses, mail chausses or with splint armour reinforcement consisting of thick leather and steel splints.

The reconstruction, including weapons has a combined weight of 105 lbs and was researched and constructed by Christopher Bond (A.K.A. Griff)

== Family ==
=== Marriage ===
Sir Thomas was married to Elizabeth Latimer (1335 - died before 1411), daughter of Sir Warine Latimer, in 1349 and subsequently inherited his father-in-law's title of Lord Braybrooke upon the latter's death in the same year.

=== Children ===
Thomas and Elizabeth had a total of 11 children as follows (In chronological order):

- Richard Griffin (1358–1411),
- Thomas Griffin,
- Hugh Griffin,
- Male - unrecorded,
- Elizabeth Griffin,
- Female - unrecorded,
- Anne Griffin,
- Female - unrecorded,
- John Griffin, (1420-1445)
- Male - unrecorded,

=== Lineage ===
The surname Griffin is thought to have derived from the Welsh Griffith. The first traceable recorded Griffin was Ralph Griffin (born 1190) and the lineage is as follows:

- Ralph Griffin (b. 1190), son of Griffith and Gwenllian.
- Ralph Griffin (b. 1210), son of Ralph Griffin and Alice De Westob (b.1190)

(Other children: Hugh Griffin & male – unrecorded)

- Richard Griffin (1236–1284), son of Ralph Griffin and Juliana De Lays (b. 1206)

(Other children: Thomas Griffin and Male – unrecorded)

- John Griffin (1272–1350), son of Richard Griffin and Matilda Carlofe/Goldfire (b1232)

(Other children: Joanne Griffin, Female – unrecorded, Agnes Griffin, Female – unrecorded, Cecily Griffin, John Griffin (b. 1262), Male – unrecorded)

- Sir Thomas Griffin (1323–1360), son of John Griffin and Elizabeth Favell (b. 1275)

(Other children: see above)

- Richard Griffin (1358–1411), son of Thomas Griffin and Elizabeth De Latimer (1335 – d before 1411)
- Nicholas Griffin (1390–1436), son of Richard Griffin and Anne Chamberlain (d. 1436)

(Other children: Margaret Griffin (b. 1390) & John Griffin)

- Nicholas Griffin (1426–1482) son of Nicholas Griffin and Margaret Pilkington (d. 1423)

(Other children: John Griffin, Male – unrecorded, Henry Griffin, Male – unrecorded, Richard Griffin, Male – unrecorded, Thomas Griffin & Male – unrecorded)

- John Griffin, Son of Nicholas Griffin and Katherine Curzon (d. 1450)

(Other children: Richard Griffin, Male – unrecorded, Edward Griffin, Isabel Griffin, Katherine Griffin, Anne Griffin, Elizabeth Griffin, Female – unrecorded, Joane Griffin and Female – unrecorded)

Their descendants include Baron Braybrooke

== Sources ==
- Feud. Aids, iv, 23; Baker, Northants. i, 72-3 (www.British-history.ac.uk/report.aspx?compid=66327)
- Feud. Aids, iv, 37; Chan. Inq. p.m. 23 Hen. VI, no. 19; ibid. 25 Hen. VI., no.40 (www.British-history.ac.uk/report.aspx?compid=66327)
- Cokayne, George Edward, The complete Perrage of England, Scotland, Irelan, Great Britain and the United Kingdom, Extant, Extinct, or Dormant (London: St Catherine Press, 1910.), 7:456, Los Angeles Public Library, 929.721 C682
- Richardson, Douglas, Magna Crata Ancestry: A Study in Colonial and Maedieval Families (Baltimore:: Genealogical Publishing Co., 2005.), p. 385.
- Camden, William, The Visitation of the County of Warwick in the Year 1619 (London: Harleian Society, 1877.), p. 167, Los Angeles Public Library, Gen 942.005 H284 v.12.
