= Heartbreak High (disambiguation) =

Heartbreak High is an Australian television series that ran from 1994–1996 and 1997–1999.

Heartbreak High may also refer to:

- Heartbreak High (2022 TV series), Netflix reboot of the original series
- Heartbreak High (film), 1981 American comedy

== See also ==
- Heartbreak (disambiguation)
- Heartbreak Hill (disambiguation)
