= Broken Heart =

Broken Heart(s) may refer to:

- Broken heart, when a human being suffers from an emotional or physical loss
- Takotsubo cardiomyopathy, or broken heart syndrome, a condition in which heart muscles are temporarily weakened
- Cheney's algorithm, a method of garbage collection in computer software systems, uses a forwarding pointer sometimes called a "broken heart"
- Broken Heart (1982–1991), Mylon LeFevre's band
- Broken Heart (album), by The Babys, and the title song, 1977

== Songs ==
- "Broken Heart" (Escape the Fate song)
- "Broken Heart" (Motion City Soundtrack song)
- "Broken Heart" (Red Flag song)
- "Broken Heart" (White Lion song)
- "Broken Heart", by Axel Rudi Pell from Wild Obsession
- "Broken Heart", by Charlotte Perrelli from Gone Too Long'
- "Broken Heart", by Eddie Vedder from Ukulele Songs
- "Broken Hearts", by Living Colour from Vivid
- "Broken Heart", by Monsta X from Rush
- "Broken Heart", by Spiritualized from Ladies and Gentlemen We Are Floating in Space

== Theater, film and television ==
- The Broken Heart, a 1633 tragedy play by John Ford
- Broken Hearts, an 1875 play by W. S. Gilbert
- Broken Heart (film), a 1994 UK short film starring Rachel Shelley
- Diljalaa (lit. 'Broken Heart'), a 1987 Indian Hindi-language film
- Diljale (lit. 'Broken Hearts'), a 1996 Indian Hindi-language film
- "Broken Heart" (Once Upon a Time), a television episode

== See also ==
- This Broken Heart (disambiguation)
- Edge of a Broken Heart (disambiguation)
- Brokenhearted (disambiguation)
- Crèvecœur (disambiguation)
- Heartbreak (disambiguation)
- Heartbreaker (disambiguation)
