= Poleyn =

Armour for the knee

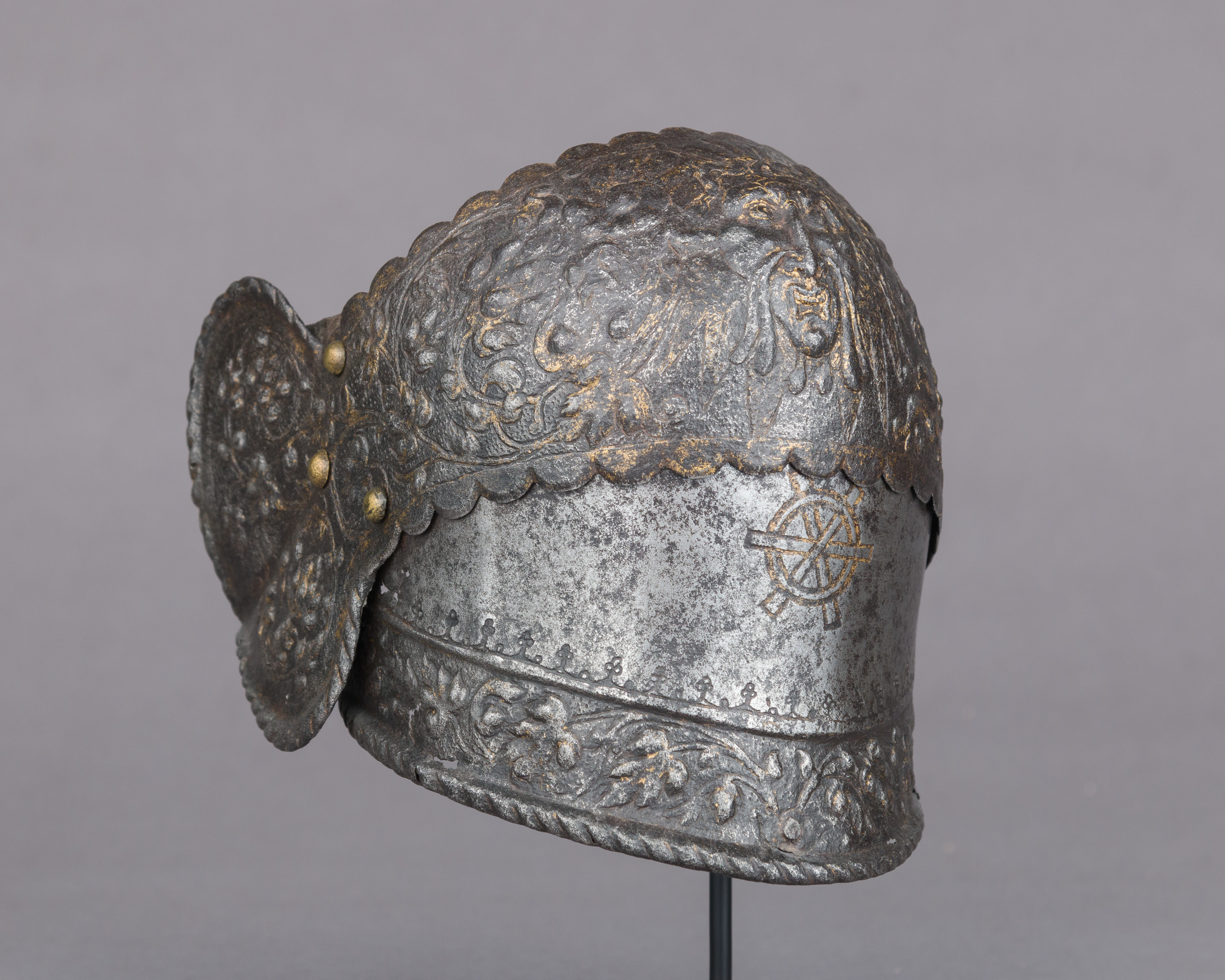
Poleyn, 1555–60

The poleyn or genouillere was a component of Medieval and Renaissance armor that protected the knee. During the transition from mail armor to plate armor, this was among the earliest plate components to develop. They first appeared around 1230 and remained in use until 1650, when firearms made them obsolete.

The specifics of poleyn design varied considerably over that period. The earliest poleyns were strapped over mail chausses. Fourteenth century and early fifteenth century poleyns usually attached to padded leggings or plate cuisses. During the fifteenth century poleyns developed an articulated construction that attached to the cuisses and schynbalds or greaves. A characteristic of late fifteenth century Gothic plate armor was a projection that guarded the side of the knee.

== Gallery ==
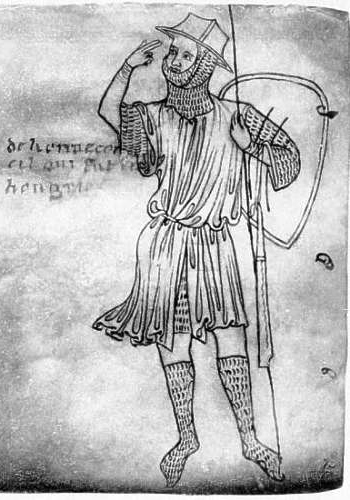
An early example of poleyns worn over chausses, from an illustration by Villard de Honnecourt (1230).

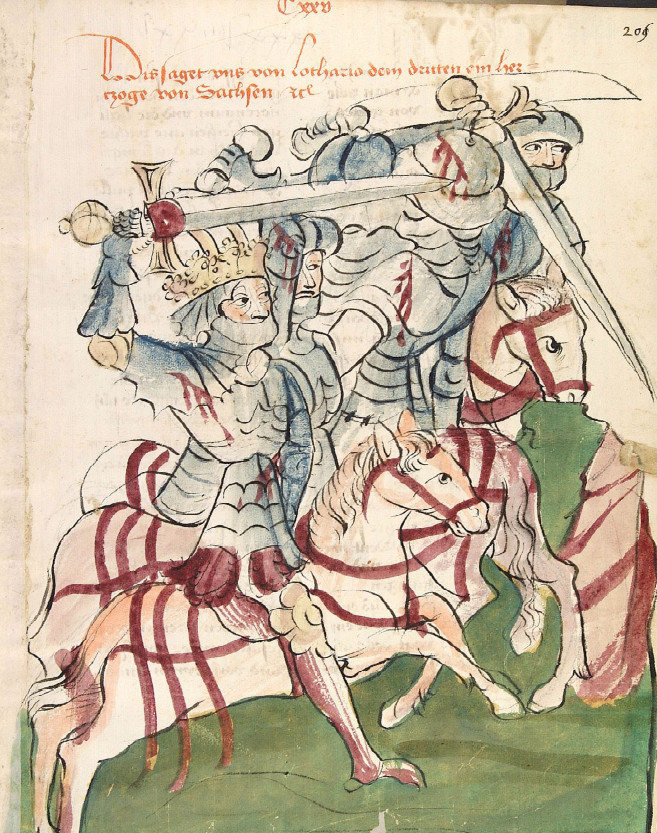
Ludwig III wearing Gothic plate armor with prominent poleyns, from a fifteenth-century manuscript.

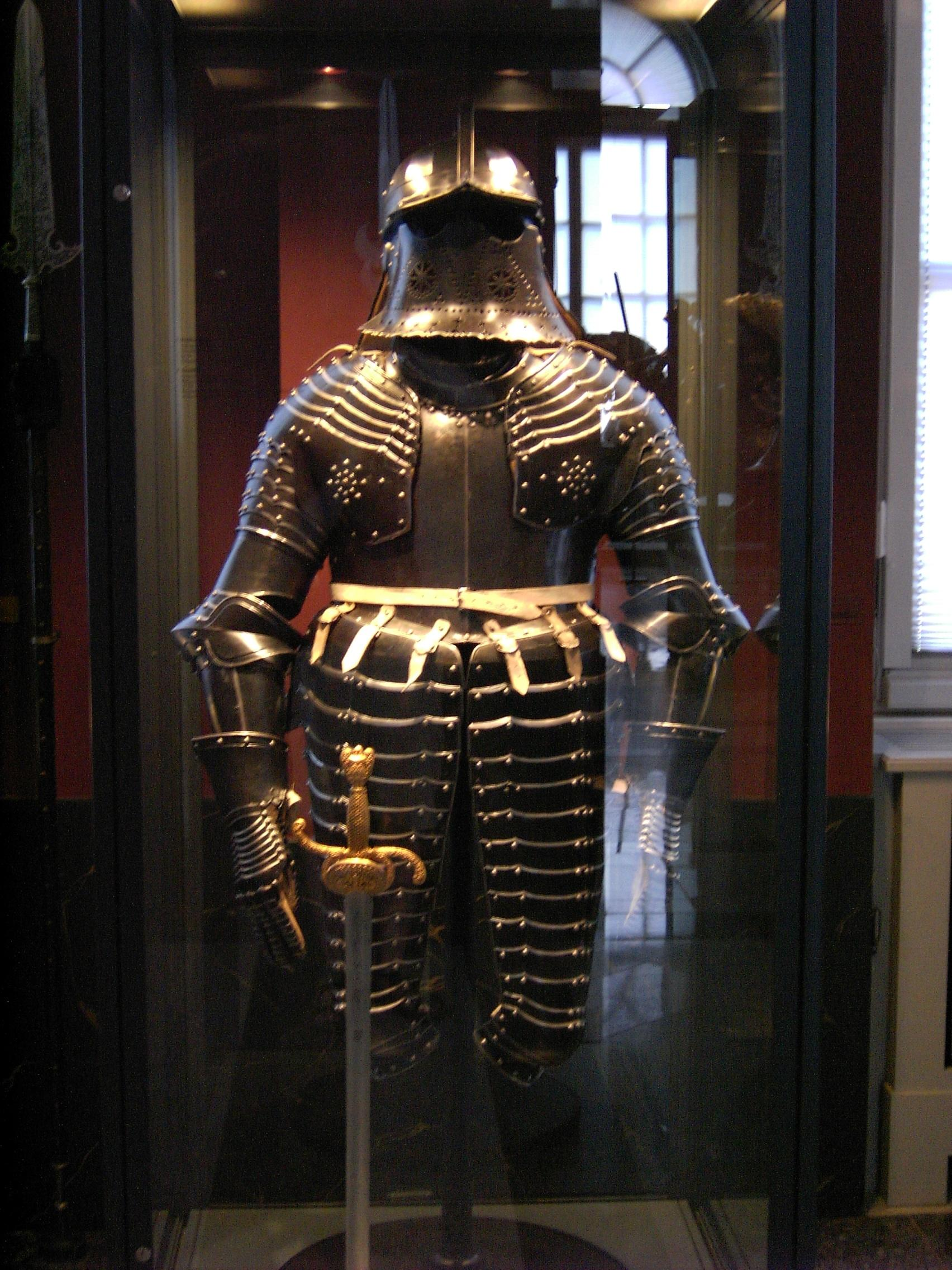
A late example of poleyns in a three-quarter suit of armor. Zwinger-Museum, Dresden.

== See also ==
- Gaiters
- Knee pad
