= Heart pain =

Heart pain (also referred to as cardialgia or cardiodynia) may refer to:

- Angina, insufficient blood flow to the heart muscles causing chest pain
- Broken heart, a metaphor for the intense stress or pain one feels at experiencing great longing
- Chest pain, pain in any region of the chest, generally considered a medical emergency
- Heart attack, lack of blood flow to part of the heart causing damage to the heart muscles
- Heartburn, a burning sensation in the central chest or upper central abdomen caused by gastric acid
- Psychological pain, an unpleasant feeling of a psychological, non-physical origin

== See also ==
- Broken heart (disambiguation)
- Heart (disambiguation)
- Pain in My Heart
