= Chausses =

Armour for the legs

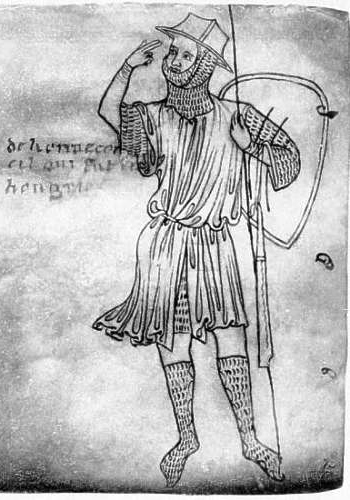
Knight wearing chausses and poleyns, from an illustration by Villard de Honnecourt (1230)

Chausses (/ˈʃoʊs/; French: [ʃos]) were a medieval term for leggings, which was also used for leg armour; routinely made of mail and referred to as mail chausses, or demi-chausses if they only cover the front half of the leg. They generally extended well above the knee, covering most of the leg. Mail chausses were the standard type of metal leg armour in Europe from the 9th to the early 14th centuries CE. Chausses offered flexible protection that was effective against most hand-powered weapons, but was gradually supplemented and then replaced with the development of iron plate armor for the legs in the second half of the 13th to first half of the 14th century.

== Terminology ==
Chausses were also worn as a woollen legging with layers, as part of civilian dress, and as a gamboised (quilted or padded) garment worn under mail chausses.

The old French word chausse, meaning stocking, survives only in modern French as the stem of the words chaussure (shoe) and chaussette (sock) and in the tongue-twister:

Les chausses sèches de l’archiduchesse
Sont elles sèches ou archisèches?

Today this is often misunderstood as "les chaussettes de l’archiduchesse". In addition, among some Catholic monastic nuns, the special stocking/leggings worn were called chausses.

== Origins and development ==
Prototype chausses are first evidenced in the late Scythian burials of Gladkovsina and Alexandrovka from the 5th century BCE, made of small scales and integrated directly into the hauberk (torso armor). By the 1st century BCE, a variation of this construction using mail armor is evidenced in a Sarmatian burial as reported by A.E. Negin. Prototype chausses separate from the torso armor develop by the 2nd century, as evidenced in a hybridized splint and scale leg armor found at the burial of Chatalka at Roshava Dragana in Bulgaria. This armor was constructed of a splinted cuisse and greave, with plate poleyns and scale demigreaves. By the 3rd century CE, independent scale demichausses were in Roman military use and have been found at the fortress of Dura Europos, dated to shortly before its destruction in 257 CE. However, none of these armors had any form of integrated armored foot, likely due to the fact they were more closely related to the use of laminated arm and leg armor called manica. However, during the 3rd century, gladiatorial mosaics show fully-enclosing shin-height mail chausses with armored foot and mail or scale sleeves with armored mittens.

Mail chausses are first archaeologically attested during the middle ages in the 9th century CE, as evidenced by the find of a mailed foot from the Kyulevcha Village Catacombs in Bulgaria, of early Bulgarian or Byzantine attribution. Byzantine art depicts shin-height mail chausses in the early phase of the New Church at Tokali Kilise in Cappadocia, datable to the third quarter of the 10th century CE. A more definitive depiction of full height maille chausses is evidenced at nearby Karanlik Kilise, dating slightly later to the 11th century CE. However, full-height mail chausses were probably already in use as early as the first or second quarter of the 9th century as shown in the Biblioteca Capitolare (Ms. CLXV) from Vercelli. They probably were transmitted up the Danube or the spine of Italy, as some form of mail or scale chausses are also evidenced in the Stuttgart Psalter of that same time period.

One of the clearest depictions of mail chausses in west Europe is in the Bayeux Tapestry of 1066–1083, with William the Conqueror and several other Normans and Early English wearing them. Chausses became more common as the 12th century progressed and by 1200 nearly all knights and men-at-arms were outfitted with them. Beginning in the 13th century CE, padded, quilted hosen or breeches would be worn over the mail chausse on the upper leg. This type of armour was known as the gamboised cuisse, and is frequently depicted in the Maciejowski "Crusader" Bible from the 1240s CE.

Reinforcing plates for knees called poleyns began to supplement mail chausses after about 1230. Because most leg armor had to be pulled on from the foot, rather than snapped on such as a breastplate, a chausse might have been considered to be worn on the foot. Steel shin plates called schynbalds came into use during the mid-13th century. Unlike greaves, schynbalds protected only the front of the lower leg. These early plate additions were worn over chausses and held in place with leather straps. While chausses never truly became obsolete, they gradually stopped being used on their own by wealthier armed retainers in the late 13th to the middle of the 14th century, as plate armour developed and became more affordable. By the 1310s to 1320s, greaves fully enclosed the leg and were being combined with poleyns and early cuisses, making leather prototypes of these iron components obsolete.
