= Weston Favell =

Area of Northampton, England

Coordinates: 52.250°N 0.846°W

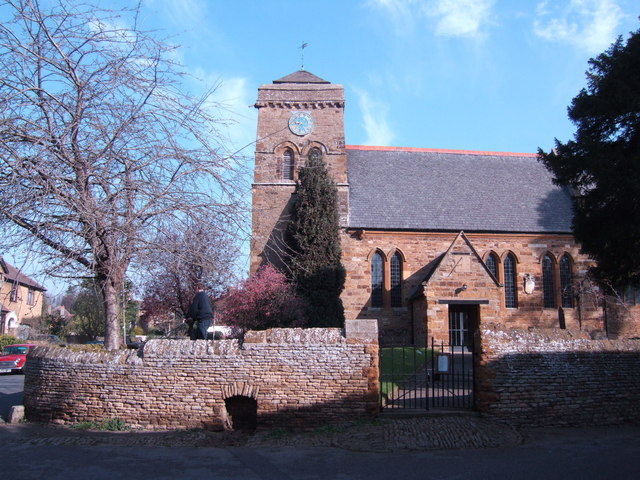
- St. Peter's Church

- Location within Northamptonshire
- Civil parish: Northampton
- Unitary authority: West Northamptonshire
- Ceremonial county: Northamptonshire
- Region: East Midlands
- Country: England
- Sovereign state: United Kingdom
- Post town: NORTHAMPTON
- Postcode district: NN3
- Dialling code: 01604
- Police: Northamptonshire
- Fire: Northamptonshire
- Ambulance: East Midlands
- UK Parliament: Northampton South

Weston Favell is an area near the eastern end of Northampton, in the West Northamptonshire district, in the ceremonial county of Northamptonshire, England.

== Location ==
Since the Industrial Revolution and the 20th century, the town of Northampton has grown closer and closer to the village boundaries, such that it is an outer district of Northampton, near to several other suburban areas. The village itself has also grown, and now includes, at its edges, several newer developments including Park Way, Graspin Lane, Pyket Way, Edgemont Road and Thorburn Road. Still, the village centre retain a distinct feel, and are clearly marked by the old boundary posts. Its most famous former resident was the late Francis Crick, co-discoverer of the structure of DNA.

== Facilities ==
Although Weston Favell's main street (the High Street) had various shops in former years, it now has none, the last shop a general store is now a main hairdresser. This general store lost its post office as part of the national scheme of closures in early 2008, despite protest by local residents. Other amenities include two public houses (the Bold Dragoon and the Trumpet), and a primary school. The school recently moved into new, larger premises, outside the village boundary. The new school was designed by the local architect Maurice Walton, whose work also includes the Northampton Guildhall extension.

The parish church (St. Peter's, Weston Favell) lies at the centre of the village, at the intersection of the High Street and Church Way. Late 2007 saw the installation of the new Rector, the Reverend David Kirby. The oldest part of the Church's graveyard, upon which the tombstones have now all but crumbled away, is known at St Peter's Patch and is used by villagers as a free space for games, picnics and summer fetes.

The nearest large park is Abington Park, which is accessed via the notably long and straight Weston Way, leading from the outskirts of the village to the stone gates to the town of Northampton, and the Abington Estate. Weston Favell is also the home of the Northamptonshire County Lawn Tennis Club, the Weston Favell Garden Society and the 11th Division of the Northamptonshire Scouts.

== History ==
Known formerly as Westone (11th century) and then Weston Fauvelle (13th century), Weston Favell, although likely much older, can trace itself with evidentiary certainly as far back as the Domesday Book of 1086, when there is evidence of the overlordship of Weston Favell being awarded to the Count of Mortain. It subsequently passed through the families of Mundeville and d'Avranches into the possession of the Crevecoeurs, under whom the lord of the manor was then John Fauvelle, hence the name.

The church building as it presently stands can be dated to a similar period. Indeed, the tower is of the late 12th century, of Transitional Norman character, and the chancel belongs mainly to the first half of the 13th century, being a rebuilding at that time of a 12th-century chancel, the priest's doorway of which was retained. This doorway is earlier than the tower and indicates the existence of a mid-12th-century building.

== Extended Weston Favell ==
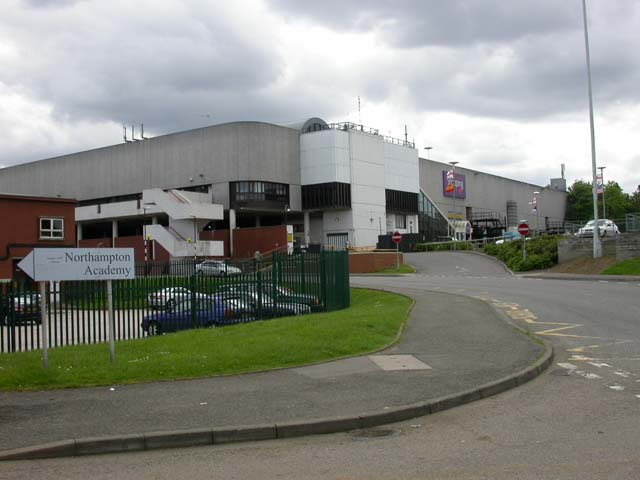
Weston Favell Shopping Centre

Weston Favell, before it was subsumed by Northampton, covered an extensive area of some 2,000 acres, reaching the Kettering Road in the North, reaching the Weston Favell Shopping Centre and Standens Barn Housing Estate in the East. The River Nene was the south Boundary, whilst in the West it crossed Rushmills Road and crossed areas that are now part of Abington Park. As a Result of this, and as there are no Official Boundaries within Northampton, institutions in this area have adopted the name 'Weston Favell' despite being many miles from the village per se. These include a secondary school called Weston Favell Academy, and further to this the Weston Favell Shopping Centre, a large facility, built during the early 1970s and opening in 1974.

== Civil parish ==
On 1 April 1965 the parish was abolished and merged with Billing. In 1961 the parish had a population of 5105.

== Notable people ==
- Francis Crick (1916–2004), Nobel Prize winning molecular biologist
- Sir Thomas Griffin (1323–1360), a Knight of Weston Favell Manor
