= Heartbreak (disambiguation) =

Heartbreak is a metaphor for a feeling of rejection by a loved one or of emotional devastation (as in mourning).

Heartbreak or heart break may also refer to:

== Film and television ==
- Heartbreak (1931 film), a film starring Charles Farrell
- Heartbreak (1979 film), a Canadian drama film
- “Heartbreak”, an episode of The Good Doctor

== Music ==
- Heartbreak (band), a London-based electronic music duo
- The Heartbreaks, an English band
- Heart Break (Lady Antebellum album), 2017
  - "Heart Break" (Lady Antebellum song), 2017
- Heart Break, 1988 album by New Edition
- Heartbreak (Bert Jansch album), 1982
- Heartbreak (Shalamar album), 1984
- "Heartbreak" (M'Black song), 2009
- "Heartbreak" (Minho song), 2021
- "Heartbreak (Make Me a Dancer)", a 2009 song by Freemasons feat. Sophie Ellis-Bextor
- "Heartbreak Song", a 2016 song by Mickey Guyton
- "Heartbreak", a 2012 song by English rock band Age of Consent
- "Heartbreak", a song by Gavin DeGraw from his 2013 album Make a Move
- "Heartbreak", a song by Hunter Hayes from his 2019 album Wild Blue (Part I)
- "A Heartbreak", a song by Australian indie folk band Angus & Julia Stone from their 2014 album Angus & Julia Stone

== See also ==
- Broken Heart (disambiguation)
- Heartbreak Hill (disambiguation)
- Heartbreak Hotel (disambiguation)
- Heartbreaker (disambiguation)
