= Tassets =

Body armour for the upper thighs

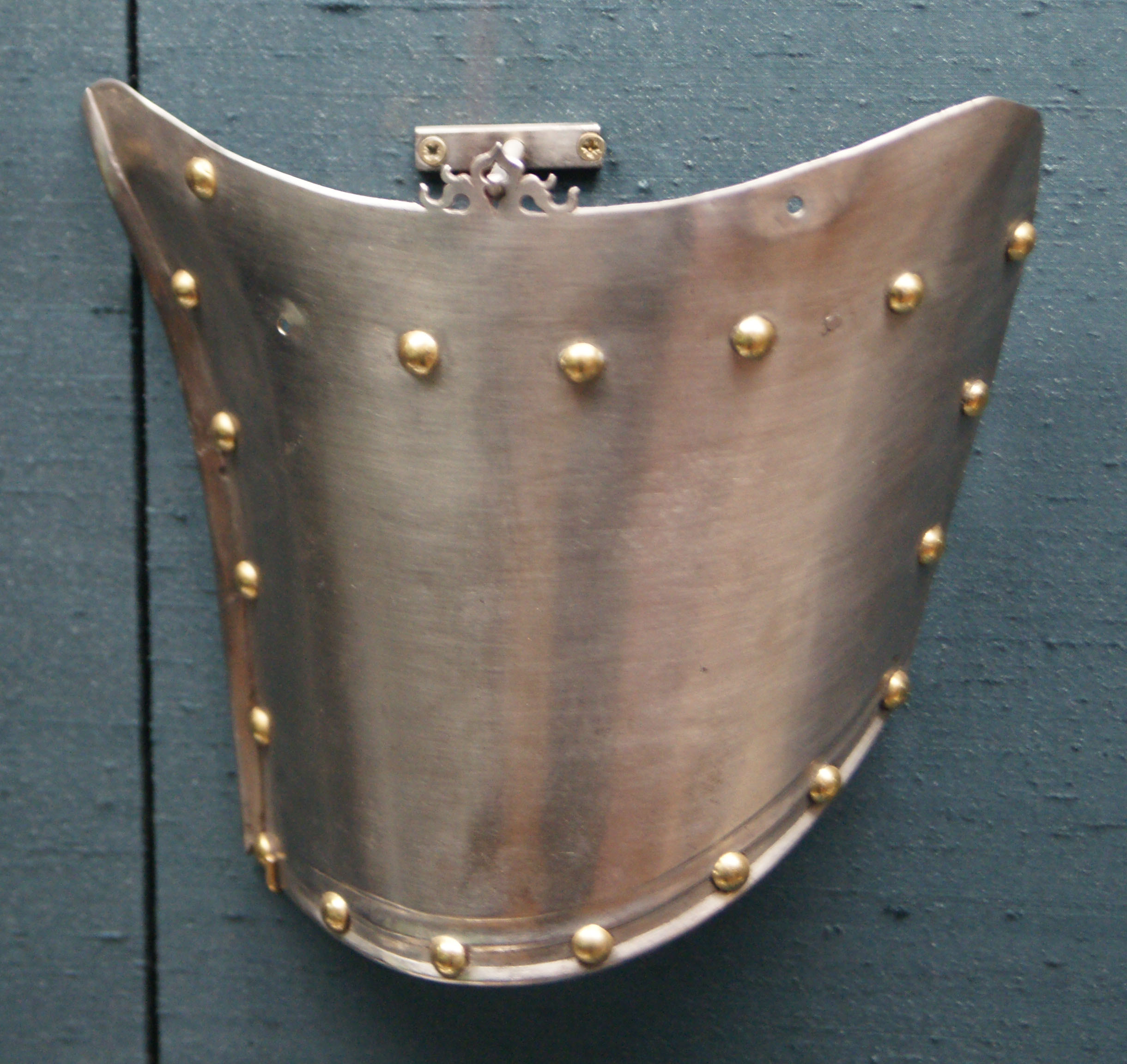
A single tasset by Lorenz Helmschmied, 1495

Tassets are a piece of plate armour designed to protect the upper thighs. They take the form of separate plates hanging from the breastplate or faulds. They may be made from a single piece or segmented. The segmented style of tassets connected by sliding rivets produced during the 16th century is also known as almain rivets. From the 16th century onward, the tassets were sometimes integrated with the cuisses to create fully articulated leg defenses that continued from the lower edge of the breastplate down to the poleyn.
