= Brokenhearted (disambiguation) =

A broken heart is a metaphor for the intense emotional stress or pain one feels at experiencing great loss or deep longing.

Brokenhearted or Broken Hearted may also refer to:

- "Brokenhearted" (Brandy song), 1995
- "Brokenhearted" (Karmin song), 2012
- "Brokenhearted" (Lawson song), 2013
- "Broken Hearted", a 2006 song by Eighteen Visions
- "Broken Hearted", a song by Eric Clapton from Pilgrim
- "Broken Hearted" (NCIS: New Orleans), a 2015 television episode
- "The Brokenhearted", a song by Bruce Springsteen from The Promise

== See also ==
- Broken Heart (disambiguation)
