= Heartbreaker =

Heartbreaker(s) or The Heart Breaker(s) may refer to:

== Film and television ==
- The Heart Breakers, a 1916 film starring Andrew Arbuckle
- The Heart Breaker, a 1925 film directed by Benjamin Stoloff
- Heartbreaker (1983 film), an American film directed by Frank Zuniga
- Heartbreakers (1984 film), an American drama directed by Bobby Roth
- Heartbreakers (2001 film), an American romantic comedy crime film directed by David Mirkin
- Heartbreaker (2010 film), a French romantic comedy directed by Pascal Chaumeil
- Heartbeat (2016 TV series) (working title Heartbreaker), an American medical comedy-drama series
- "Heartbreaker" (Grimm), a television episode

== Literature ==
- Heartbreaker, a 2000 novel by Julie Garwood
- Heartbreaker, a 2018 novel by Claudia Dey
- Heartbreakers, a comic book series published by Dark Horse Comics, IDW Publishing, and Image Comics

== Music ==
=== Performers ===
- The Heartbreakers, or Johnny Thunders and the Heartbreakers, an American punk rock band
- Tom Petty and the Heartbreakers, an American rock band

=== Albums ===
- Heartbreaker (Dionne Warwick album), or the title song (see below), 1982
  - The Heartbreaker Demos, an album containing the demos made by Barry Gibb for Warwick's album, 2006
- Heartbreaker (Dolly Parton album), or the title song (see below), 1978
- Heartbreaker (Free album), or the title song, 1973
- Heartbreaker (G-Dragon album), or the title song (see below), 2009
- Heartbreaker (Inna album) or the title song, 2020
- Heartbreaker (Marie Ueda album) or the title song, 2020
- Heartbreaker (The O'Jays album), or the title song, 1993
- Heartbreaker (Ryan Adams album), 2000
- Heartbreakers (soundtrack), by Tangerine Dream, from the 1984 film
- Heartbreaker, by BZN, 1986
- Heartbreaker, by the Dark Romantics, 2008
- Heartbreaker, by Jess Moskaluke, 2023
- Heartbreaker, by Marmalade, 1982

=== Songs ===
- "Heartbreaker" (Dionne Warwick song), 1982
- "Heartbreaker" (Dolly Parton song), 1978
- "Heartbreaker" (G-Dragon song), 2009
- "Heartbreaker" (Jess Moskaluke song), 2023
- "Heartbreaker" (Justin Bieber song), 2013
- "Heartbreaker" (Led Zeppelin song), 1969
- "Heartbreaker" (Loïc Nottet song), 2020
- "Heartbreaker" (Mariah Carey song), 1999
- "Heartbreaker" (Pat Benatar song), 1979
- "Heartbreaker" (will.i.am song), 2008
- "Heartbreaker"/"Days", by the Rasmus, 2002
- "Doo Doo Doo Doo Doo (Heartbreaker)", by the Rolling Stones, 1973
- "Heartbreaker", by Airbourne from Runnin' Wild, 2007
- "Heartbreaker", by Alabama Shakes from Boys & Girls, 2012
- "Heartbreaker", by the Andrews Sisters and the Harmonica Gentlemen, 1948
- "Heartbreaker", by Axel Rudi Pell from Shadow Zone, 2002
- "Heartbreaker", by B.B. King from Blues on Top of Blues, 1968
- "Heartbreaker", by Brett Eldredge from Brett Eldredge, 2017
- "Heartbreaker", by Caravan from The Album, 1980
- "Heartbreaker", by the Cardigans from First Band on the Moon, 1996
- "Heartbreaker", by Color Me Badd from C.M.B., 1991
- "Heartbreaker", by the Crows, 1953
- "Heartbreaker", by Danity Kane from Danity Kane, 2006
- "Heartbreaker", by the Dukes, 1979
- "Heartbreaker", by Electric Light Orchestra from Electric Light Orchestra Part Two, 1990
- "Heartbreaker", by Enrique Iglesias from Euphoria, 2010
- "Heartbreaker", by Girls from Broken Dreams Club, 2010
- "Heartbreaker", by Grand Funk Railroad from On Time, 1969
- "Heartbreaker", by Metronomy from Nights Out, 2008
- "Heartbreaker", by Michael Jackson from Invincible, 2001
- "Heartbreaker", by Motörhead from Aftershock, 2013
- "Heartbreaker", by MSTRKRFT from Fist of God, 2009
- "Heartbreaker", by Mumzy Stranger, 2011
- "Heartbreaker", by Musical Youth from The Youth of Today, 1982
- "Heartbreaker", by Nantucket from Nantucket, 1978
- "Heartbreaker", by Nicole Scherzinger from Big Fat Lie, 2014
- "Heartbreaker", by Pink, a B-side of the single "Stupid Girls", 2006
- "Heartbreaker", by Steve Aoki from Wonderland, 2012
- "Heartbreaker", by the Strawbs from Burning for You, 1977
- "Heartbreaker", by Tank from Sex, Love & Pain, 2007
- "Heartbreaker", by Warren Zeiders from Pretty Little Poison, 2023
- "Heartbreaker", by Zapp from Zapp III, 1983
- "Heartbreaker", written by Ned Miller, 1933
- "HeartBreaker", by Teriyaki Boyz, from Beef or Chicken?, 2006

== Professional wrestling ==
- The Heartbreakers (wrestlers) or The Heart Throbs, a professional wrestling tag team

== See also ==
- Heartbreak (disambiguation)
- Broken Heart (disambiguation)
