= Cuisses =

Armour worn to protect the thighs

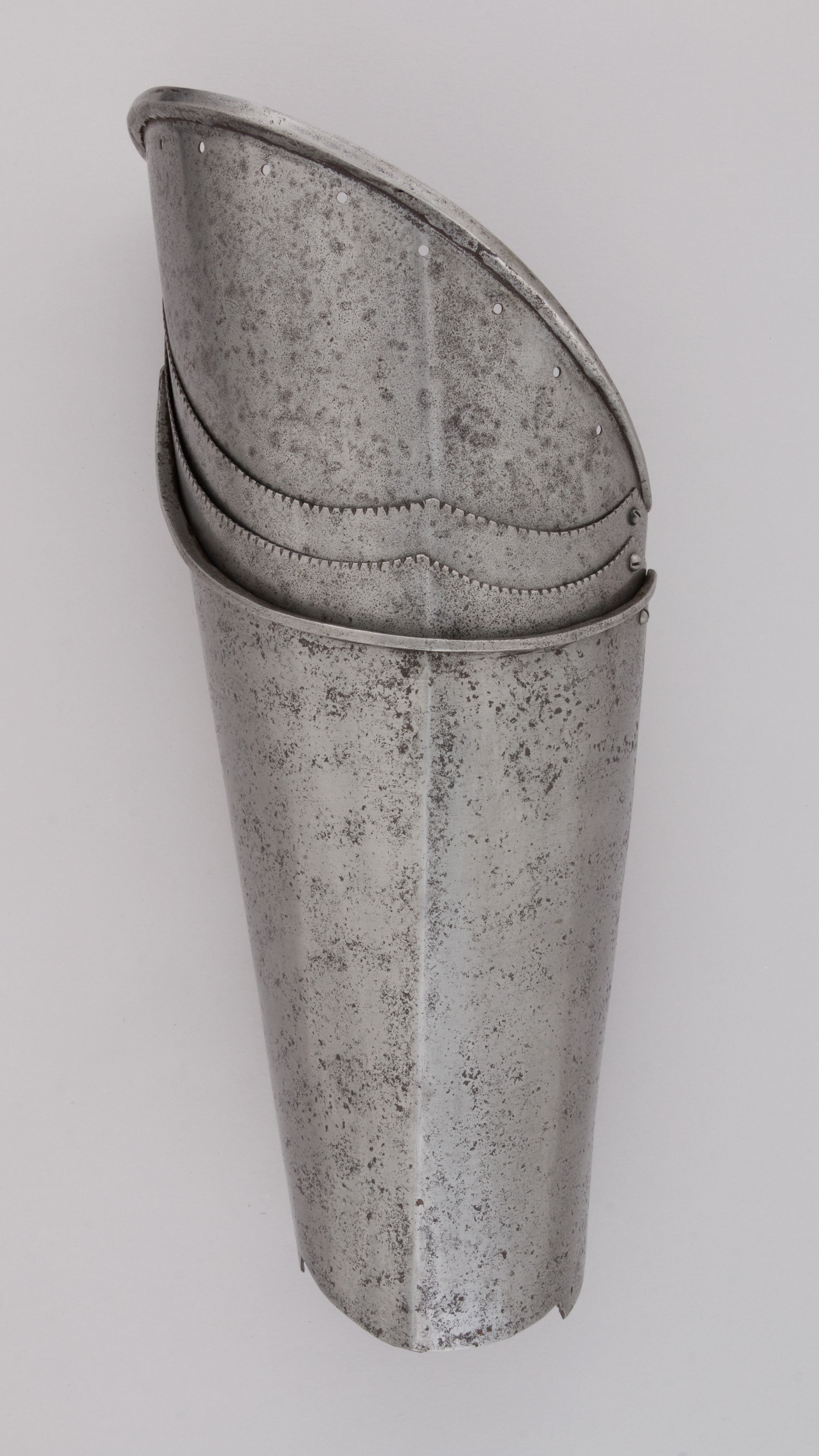
Italian cuisse, circa 1450

Cuisses (/kwɪs/; /kwis/; French: [kɥis]) are a form of medieval armour worn to protect the thigh. The word is the plural of the French word cuisse meaning 'thigh'. While the skirt of a maille shirt or tassets of a cuirass could protect the upper legs from above, a thrust from below could avoid these defenses. Thus, cuisses were worn on the thighs to protect from such blows. Padded cuisses made in a similar way to a gambeson were commonly worn by knights in the 12th and 13th centuries, usually over chausses, and may have had poleyns directly attached to them. Whilst continental armours tended to have cuisses that did not protect the back of the thigh, English cuisses were typically entirely encapsulating, due to the English preference for foot combat over the mounted cavalry charges favoured by continental armies.

Cuisses could also be made of brigandine or splinted leather, but beginning around 1340 they were typically made from steel plate armour. From 1370 onward they were made from a single plate of iron or steel.

== Ancient Greece ==
Perimeridia (Ancient Greek: περιμηρίδια) and Parameridia (παραμηρίδια) were metal armour for covering the thighs. Though not in common use in the ordinary Greek panoply, are shown sufficiently often on the monuments and vase-paintings as occasionally employed by Greek warriors at least as far back as the fifth century B.C. They are frequently mentioned by Greek writers, of the third century B.C. and downwards, but here almost exclusively as employed by cavalry, both for the rider and his horse (in addition, some writers call the protective armour of the horse parapleuridia (παραπλευρίδια), while others makes a further distinction of παραπλευρίδια for horses driven in chariots and παραμηρίδια for those ridden by the cavalry).
