= Edge of a Broken Heart =

Edge of a Broken Heart may refer to:

- Edge of a Broken Heart (Vixen song) (released 1988), song by American glam metal band Vixen
- Edge of a Broken Heart (Bon Jovi song) (released 1987), song by American rock band Bon Jovi
