= This Broken Heart =

This Broken Heart may refer to several songs:

- "This Broken Heart" (1959), from American Doo Wop vocal quintet The Sonics
- "This Broken Heart" (1973), from American funk band Funkadelic's album Cosmic Slop, a cover version of The Sonics' original.
- "This Broken Heart" (2003), from California rock band Something Corporate's album North
- "This Broken Heart" (2006), from New Zealand rock band Tadpole's album Tadpole
