= Schynbalds =

Shin armour, Europe, 14th and 15th centuries

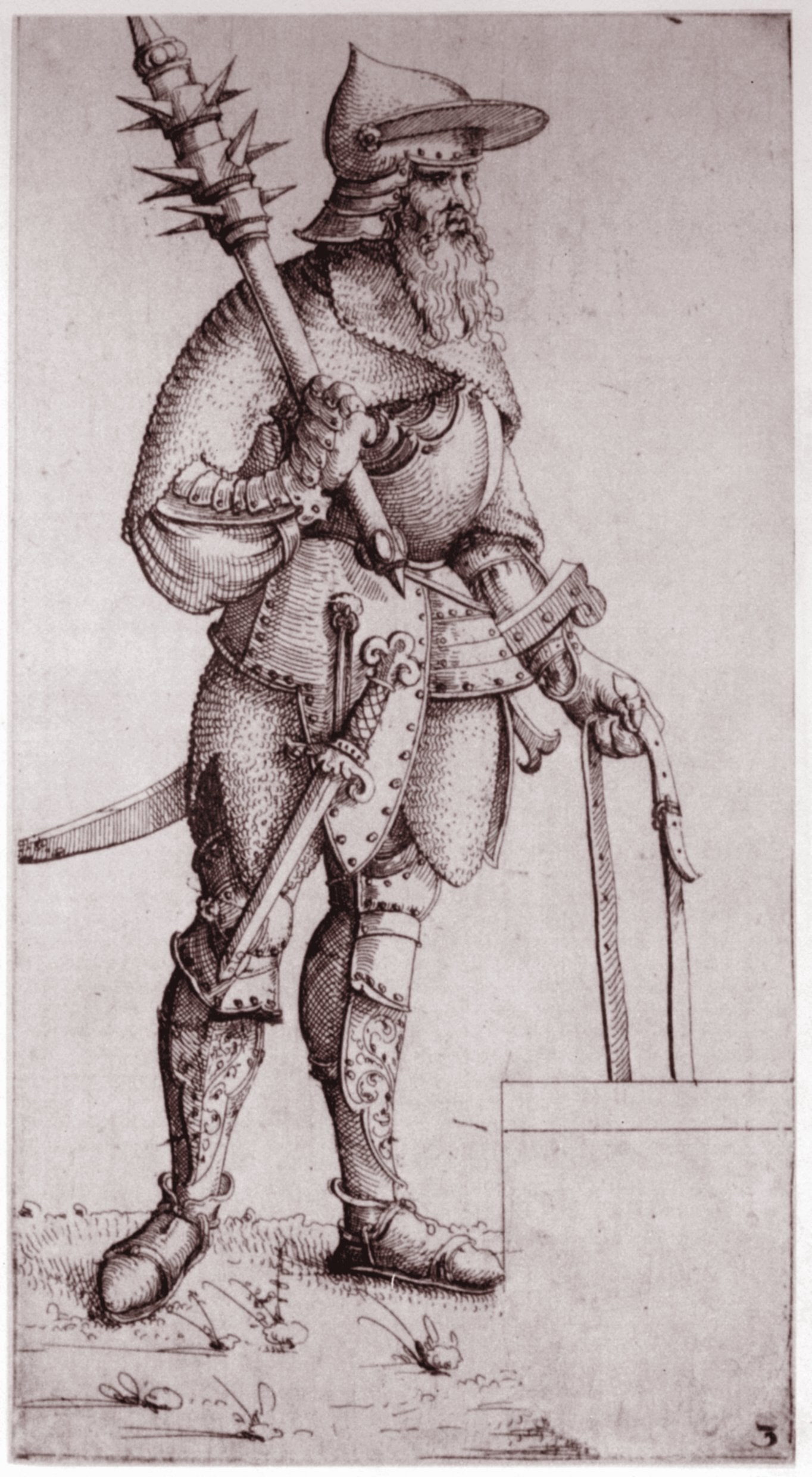
King Sigismund II of Poland wearing armor with schynbalds, from a period engraving.

Schynbalds were an early experiment in plate armour for the lower leg. Schynbalds were metal plates strapped over chausses. Each schynbald was a single piece of steel that covered the front and outside of the shin. Schynbalds did not enclose the lower leg: hence, they were not true greaves. Schynbalds first appeared in the 1230s or 1250s and remained in use during the fourteenth and fifteenth centuries.

Complete suits of armor survive only from the latter part of the schynbald era. In fifteenth century Gothic armour they were strapped not to mail but to fastenings on a padded undergarment. By the early fifteenth century greaves had supplanted schynbalds in white armour. Schynbalds were essentially obsolete by the sixteenth century.
