= Heartbreak Hotel (disambiguation) =

"Heartbreak Hotel" is a song by Elvis Presley.

Heartbreak Hotel may also refer to:

== Arts, entertainment, and media ==
=== Films ===
- Heartbreak Hotel (film), a 1988 American comedy film

=== Literature ===
- Heartbreak Hotel, a 2017 Alex Delaware series novel by Jonathan Kellerman
- Heartbreak Hotel, a 2013 novel by Deborah Moggach
- Heartbreak Hotel, a 1976 novel by Anne Rivers Siddons
- Heartbreak Hotel, a 2018 play by Floyd Mutrux
- Heartbreak Hotel (comics), a 1987–88 "Lifestyle Comics Magazine" published by Willyprods / Small Time Ink

=== Music ===
- "Heartbreak Hotel" (Whitney Houston song), 1998
- "Heartbreak Hotel" (Yohio song), 2013
- "Heartbreak Hotel", a song by Grieves from the 2011 album Together/Apart
- "Heartbreak Hotel", a 2016 song by Tiffany Young, featuring Simon Dominic for SM Station
- "Heartbreak Hotel", 2021 album by Phora
- "This Place Hotel", a 1980 song by The Jacksons; originally titled "Heartbreak Hotel"

=== Television ===
- "Heartbreak Hotel" (The Simpsons), episode of animated series The Simpsons
- "Heartbreak Hotel" (Castle), an episode of the ABC show Castle
- "Heartbreak Hotel" (Porridge), an episode of the BBC sitcom Porridge
- "Heartbreak Hotel", an episode of Doctor Who Confidential from "The God Complex"

== Other uses ==
- Ramada Plaza JFK Hotel, New York hotel used several times to house relatives of airplane crash victims

== See also ==
- Heartburn Hotel, British sitcom
