= Heartbreak Hill =

Heartbreak Hill may refer to:

== Places ==
- Heartbreak Hill refers to several ascents in footraces considered difficult for the runners:
  - in the Boston Marathon, Heartbreak Hill is an ascent about 20 miles (32 km) from the start
  - in Falkirk parkrun, this is the name of the incline that participants tackle 3 km into the event
  - in the City2Surf (Sydney), Heartbreak Hill is a 2 km incline on New South Head Road starting about 6 km into the race
  - a steep sand dune located at Cable Beach in Broome, Western Australia, popular with tourists and locals for walking.
- Heartbreak Hill, a set of locks more formally known as the Cheshire Locks on the Trent and Mersey Canal
- Heartbreak Hill, local name for a work program operational in Redcar and Cleveland from 1932 to 1938, officially known as the Cleveland Work Camps

== Music ==
- Heartbreak Hill (band), a Canadian country music band
- Heartbreak Hill (album), an album by English band Strawbs (1978–1995)
- "Heartbreak Hill" (song), a song by Emmylou Harris from Bluebird (1989)
- Heartbreak Hill, an album by English guitarist Albert Lee (2003)
