= Crèvecœur =

Crèvecœur or Creve Coeur may refer to:

- A French term for broken heart
- Crèvecœur chicken, a French poultry breed
- Creve Coeur, Illinois, a village near Peoria, Illinois on the Illinois River in Tazewell County
- Fort Crevecoeur, a former French fort near present-day Creve Coeur, Illinois
- Creve Coeur, Missouri, a suburb of St. Louis, Missouri
- Creve Coeur Lake Memorial Park
- Crèvecoeur (film), a 1955 documentary film
- Fort Crevecoeur, Dutch slave fort erected in Accra, Ghana in 1649, renamed to Ussher Fort after it came under British control
- Creve Coeur, Mauritius

== French communes ==
- Crèvecœur-en-Auge, in the Calvados department
- Crèvecœur-en-Brie, in the Seine-et-Marne department
- Crèvecœur-sur-l'Escaut, in the Nord department
- Crèvecœur-le-Petit, in the Oise department
- Crèvecœur-le-Grand, in the Oise department

== People with the surname ==
- J. Hector St. John de Crèvecœur (1735–1813), French-American writer
- Jacques Boucher de Crèvecœur de Perthes (1788–1868), French geologist
- Pascaline Crêvecoeur (born 1982), Belgian-French actress
- Philippe de Crèvecœur d'Esquerdes (1418–1494), French military commander
