= 1992 Birthday Honours =

British government recognitions

The Queen's Birthday Honours are announced on or around the date of the Queen's Official Birthday in the Australia, Canada, New Zealand and the United Kingdom. The dates vary, both from year to year and from country to country. All are published in supplements to the London Gazette and many are conferred by the monarch (or her representative) some time after the date of the announcement, particularly for those service people on active duty.

== United Kingdom ==
=== Life Peer ===
To be Barons

- Sir Derek Coates Barber, Environment Consultant, Humberts, Chartered Surveyors. Chairman, Countryside Commission 1981-91.
- The Honourable Sir Bernard Richard Braine, DL, Father of the House of Commons 1987-1992.

=== Privy Counsellor ===
- Alan James Beith, MP, Member of Parliament for Berwick-upon-Tweed. Liberal Democrat Spokesman on Treasury and Economic Affairs.

=== Knight Bachelor ===
- Professor Adolf William Asscher, Chairman, Committee on the Safety of Medicines.
- Peter Maurice Barclay, CBE, Chairman, Social Security Advisory Committee.
- Roger Birch, QPM, CBE, Chief Constable, Sussex Police.
- Louis Jacques Blom-Cooper, QC, Chairman, Mental Health Act Commission. Chairman, Independent Committee for the Supervision of Standards of Telephone Services.
- Geoffrey Arthur Cass, Chairman, Royal Shakespeare Company.
- Professor John Grahame Douglas Clark, CBE. For services to prehistoric archaeology.
- Alan Cockshaw, Chairman, AMEC plc.
- Michael John Day, OBE, Chairman, Commission for Racial Equality.
- Brian Keith Follett, FRS, Professor of Zoology, University of Bristol and the Biological Secretary, The Royal Society.
- Alan John Hardcastle, Chief Accountancy Adviser to the Treasury and Head of the Government Accountancy Service.
- David William Hardy, lately Chairman, London Docklands Development Corporation.
- Michael William Hirst. For political and public service.
- Gordon Howard Eliot Hodgkin, CBE, Painter.
- Anthony John Patrick Kenny, President of the British Academy.
- James Alexander Kilfedder, MP. For political service.
- Peter Julian Kitcatt, CB, Speaker's Secretary, House of Commons.
- Ivan John Lawrence, QC, MP. For political service.
- Andrew Lloyd Webber. For services to the Arts.
- Bruce Dugald MacPhail, Managing Director, Peninsular and Oriental Steam Navigation Company.
- Professor David Kean Mason, CBE, President, General Dental Council and Professor of Oral Medicine, University of Glasgow.
- James Richard Samuel Morris, CBE, Chairman, Brown and Root Limited. For services to Industry and Science.
- Desmond Henry Pitcher, Group Chief Executive, the Littlewoods Organisation. For services to the public in Liverpool.
- Alick Michael Rankin, CBE, Chairman, Scottish and Newcastle plc.
- George Russell, CBE, Chairman, Independent Television Commission.
- Colin Grieve Southgate, Chairman and Chief Executive, Thorn EMI plc.
- Herbert Keith Speed, RD, MP. For political service.
- James Frazer Stirling, Partner, James Stirling, Michael Wilford and Associates.
- Anthony John Tennant, Chairman, Guinness plc.
- Malcolm George Thornton, MP. For political service.
- Roy Watts, CBE, Chairman, Thames Water plc.
- David Harry White, DL, Chairman, Board of Governors, Nottingham Polytechnic. Chairman, Nottingham Health Authority.
- Norman Samuel Wooding, CBE, Chairman, East European Trade Council. President, BSCC (formerly British/Soviet Chamber of Commerce). For services to Export.
- Peter George Yarranton. For services to Sport.

=== Order of the Bath ===
==== Knight Grand Cross (GCB) ====
Military Division

Royal Navy

- Admiral Sir John (Cunningham Kirkwood) Slater, KCB LVO.

Royal Air Force

- Air Chief Marshal Sir Brendan Jackson, KCB.

Civil Division

- Sir Frederick Edward Robin Butler, KCB CVO, Secretary of the Cabinet and Head of the Home Civil Service.

==== Knight Commander (KCB) ====
Military Division

Royal Navy

- Vice Admiral Roy Thomas Newman, CB.
- Vice Admiral Anthony Peter Woodhead.

Army

- Lieutenant General Peter Royson Duffell, CBE MC (466356), late 2nd King Edward VII's Own Gurkha Rifles (The Sirmoor Rifles).

Royal Air Force

- Air Marshal Roger Mark Austin, AFC.
- Air Marshal John Hulme Harris, CB CBE.

Civil Division

- Geoffrey Howes Chipperfield, CB, Permanent Secretary and Chief Executive, Property Services Agency.

==== Companion (CB) ====
Military Division

Royal Navy

- Rear Admiral Richard Hardy Burn, AFC.
- Rear Admiral Alexander Bruce Richardson.
- Major General Andrew Francis Whitehead, DSO, Royal Marines

Army

- Major General Nicholas George Picton Ansell, OBE (450123), late 5th Royal Inniskilling Dragoon Guards.
- Major General David Francis Edmund Botting, CBE (451167), late Royal Army Ordnance Corps.
- Major General Anthony Neil Carlier, OBE (454995), late Corps of Royal Engineers.
- Major General Antony Makepeace-Warne, MBE (458344), late The Light Infantry.
- Major General Anthony John Griffin Pollard, CBE (446685), late The Royal Anglian Regiment.

Royal Air Force

- Air Vice-Marshal David Richard Hawkins, MBE.
- Air Vice-Marshal Robert Geoffrey Peters.
- Air Vice-Marshal Andrew Lyle Roberts, CBE AFC.

Civil Division

- Geoffrey Howard Beetham, Grade 3, Treasury Solicitor's Department.
- Michael John Vincent Bell, Deputy Secretary, Ministry of Defence.
- Alan Winthrop Brown, Grade 3, Department of Employment.
- Peter Joseph Michael Butter, Grade 3, Property Services Agency.
- Charles William Capstick, CMG, Deputy Secretary, Ministry of Agriculture, Fisheries and Food.
- John Robert Deverell, MBE, Grade 3, Ministry of Defence.
- Alasdair MacLeod Fraser, QC, Director of Public Prosecutions for Northern Ireland.
- Paul Illife Freeman, Controller and Chief Executive, Her Majesty's Stationery Office.
- Norman Morgan Hale, Grade 3, Department of Health.
- Charles Edward Henderson, Head of the Office of Arts and Libraries.
- Brian James George Hilton, Director, Citizen's Charter Unit, Cabinet Office.
- Edward Benjamin Crofton Osmotherly, Deputy Secretary, Department of Transport.
- Hamish Robertson, MBE, lately Grade 3, Scottish Office.
- Michael Roper, lately Keeper of the Public Records, Lord Chancellor's Department.
- (Ronald) Rex (Barry) Shutler, Chief Executive, Valuation Office Agency.
- Derek John Wiblin, Grade 3, Crown Prosecution Service.

=== Order of Saint Michael and Saint George ===
==== Companion (CMG) ====
- Frederick Ray Mingay, Consul-General, Chicago.

=== Royal Victorian Order ===
==== Knight Commander (KCVO) ====
- Major Peter Cecil Clarke, CVO.
- Geoffrey Ivor de Deney, CVO.
- Robin John Dent.
- Captain Henry Nicholas Nevile.

==== Commander (CVO) ====
- Malcolm Blanch, LVO.
- Lady Myra Alice Butter.
- Charles Frederick Corbett.
- Sir Eric James Neal, AC.
- Andrew Turnbull, CB.
- Lee Watts.

==== Lieutenant (LVO) ====
- Wing Commander Nigel Edward Lord Beresford, Royal Air Force.
- Derek Charles Chappell, MVO RVM.
- Frances Susan Dimond, MVO.
- Professor Frederick Edward Edwards.
- Commander John Bartlett Harvey, Royal Navy.
- George Leslie Hill.
- Philip Douglas Mackie.
- William Lowrie Sleigh.
- The Honourable John Hamo Thorneycroft.

==== Member (MVO) ====
- Captain Conolly Richard Morris-Adams, Irish Guards.
- Alfred William Curral, MBE.
- Daphne Patricia Ford.
- William John Lester Gibson.
- Patricia Mary Griffiths.
- Viola Bridget Pemberton-Pigott.
- Chief Inspector David John Robinson, Metropolitan Police.
- Warrant Officer William Woodcock, (N0593845), Royal Air Force.

=== Royal Victorian Medal (Gold) ===
- George William Bushell, RVM.

=== Bar to the Royal Victorian Medal (Silver) ===
- Margaret Rachel Coleman, RVM.
- John McVitty, RVM.
- Ernest Anthony Skelton, RVM.

=== Royal Victorian Medal (Silver) ===
- Petty Officer Cook Nigel Paul Allan, (D133505 G) Royal Navy.
- Raymond Christopher Apperley.
- Dragica Barbaric.
- Henry John Childs.
- Thelma Rose Childs.
- Peter Frost.
- Terence Patrick Gilleran.
- Albert James Glass.
- Norman George Goldsmith.
- Roger King.
- Sergeant Thomas Rodger McNeil McCormick, (B8120899), Royal Air Force (Ptr. and Fnr).
- David John Middleton.
- Cecil John Ritchie.
- Chief Technician Joseph John Thompson, (C1945609), Royal Air Force (Eng. Tech. Air).

=== Companion of Honour (CH) ===
- Dame Elisabeth Frink, DBE, Sculptor.
- Joseph Needham, FRS, Emeritus Director, Needham Research Institute (East Asian History of Science Library).

=== Order of the British Empire ===
==== Dame Commander (DBE) ====
- Moura Lympany, CBE, Concert Pianist. For services to music
- Wendy Mitchell, OBE. For political and public service.
- Shirley Anne Oxenbury, OBE. For political service.

==== Knight Commander (KBE) ====
- Professor Ernest Ronald Oxburgh, Chief Scientific Adviser.

==== Commander (CBE) ====
Military Division

Royal Navy

- Captain William John Davis.
- Captain Peter James Grindal.
- Captain John Hall.
- Captain Alexander Malcolm Morrice.

Army

- Colonel (now Brigadier) Nigel Michael Haynes, MBE (476538), late 2nd King Edward VII's Own Gurkha Rifles (The Sirmoor Rifles).
- Colonel Brian William Francis Holt (488212), late Irish Guards.
- Brigadier William Abbott Leblanc-Smith, MBE (452434), late 4th/7th Royal Dragoon Guards.
- Brigadier Anthony Fergus Sarel Ling, OBE (470102), late The Queen's Regiment.
- Colonel James Alastair McGregor, MC (474006), late The Parachute Regiment.
- Colonel Christopher John Newbould, MBE (469065), late The Gloucestershire Regiment.
- Brigadier Gael Kathleen Ramsey, MBE (486886), Women's Royal Army Corps.
- Colonel Michael John Ellerington Taylor, TD (452348), late Royal Regiment of Artillery, Territorial Army.

Royal Air Force

- Group Captain Michael Anthony Basnett.
- Group Captain Richard James Gowring.
- Air Commodore James Stuart Hall, Royal Air Force (Retired).
- Group Captain Christopher Terence Moore.
- Group Captain Ronald Nield, Royal Air Force (Retired).

Civil Division

- Ian Charles Franklin Andrews, TD, Grade 5, Ministry of Defence.
- Ronald Ashford, Group Director, Safety Regulation, Civil Aviation Authority.
- Ernest Dennis Barkway, OBE, Leader, London Borough of Bromley. Vice Chairman, London Boroughs Association.
- Peter Gibbs Birch, Group Chief Executive, Abbey National plc.
- Harold Edward Bolter, Director, Corporate Affairs and Company Secretary, British Nuclear Fuels plc.
- Graham Maitland Bowie, Chief Executive, Lothian Regional Council.
- John Moore Bridges, Professor of Haematology, Queen's University, Belfast.
- Professor Leonard Broadbent, OBE, lately Chairman, British Agrochemical Standards Inspection Scheme Limited.
- Gillian Brown, Professor of English as an International Language, Cambridge University.
- Anthony David Burton, lately Chairman, London International Financial Futures and Options Exchange.
- Michael Caine, Actor.
- Simon Dallas, The Earl Cairns, Chairman, Voluntary Service Overseas.
- Barry James Capon, Chief Executive and Clerk, Norfolk County Council.
- Mary Patricia Case. For political and public service.
- Geoffrey Duncan Chisholm, FRSE, Professor of Surgery, University of Edinburgh. Director, Nuffield Transplant Unit, Western General Hospital, Edinburgh.
- Rafe Henry Clutton, lately Crown Estate Receiver.
- Peter John Constable, Principal Medical Officer, Office of the Minister for the Civil Service.
- Anthony Thomas Cox, Grade 5, Staff Inspector, Her Majesty's Inspectorate, Department of Education and Science.
- The Honourable Thomas Robin Valerian Dixon, MBE, Managing Director, Redland (Northern Ireland) Limited. For services to sport and to the community in Northern Ireland.
- Mary Douglas, Social Anthropologist.
- John Carter Dunning. For public service in Cumbria.
- Professor Kenneth James Durrands, Rector, Huddersfield Polytechnic.
- Professor Gordon Malcolm Edge, Chief Executive, Scientific Generics Group plc.
- Professor Ronald Walter Edwards, DSC, Member, National Rivers Authority. For services to the water industry in Wales.
- Leonard Cedric Eppel, Chairman, Arrowcroft Property Group. For services to the restoration of the Albert Dock, Liverpool.
- David Evans, Director General, National Farmers' Union.
- Timothy Martin Evans, Chairman, The Energy Industries Council. Lately Chairman, Thames Valley Enterprise. Deputy Chairman, Foster Wheeler Energy Limited. For services to Export.
- John Robert Fletcher, Honorary Director of Tree Aid, lately President, Institute of Chartered Foresters.
- Mark Treanor Thomasin-Foster, DL, Chairman, Consultative Panel on Badgers and Tuberculosis.
- William Stevenson Fyfe, OBE, Chairman, Ayrshire and Arran Health Board.
- Anthony Peter Garrett. For political service.
- Peter Raymond Godwin, President, Anglo-Taiwan Trade Committee. Managing Director, Chartered West LB Limited. For services to Export.
- John (Ian) James Griffen Good, Managing Director, Robertson and Baxter Limited, Glasgow.
- Michael Thomas Hancock. For political and public service.
- Joan Irene Harbison. For public service in Northern Ireland.
- Professor Martin Best Harris, Vice-Chancellor, University of Essex.
- Brian Hayes, QPM, Her Majesty's Inspector of Constabulary.
- Peter John Dixon Hodgson, OBE. For political service.
- Clive Hodson, Managing Director, London Buses Limited.
- Walter Werner Holland, President, Faculty of Public Health Medicine. Professor of Public Health Medicine, United Medical and Dental Schools, Guy's and St. Thomas' Hospitals.
- Elisabeth Anne Hoodless, Executive Director, Community Service Volunteers.
- Keith Wood Humphreys, Chairman and Managing Director, Rhône-Poulenc Limited. For services to the Chemical Industry.
- Sir Peter Craft Hutchison, Bt., Chairman, Board of Trustees, Royal Botanic Garden Edinburgh.
- Elizabeth Joan Jennings, Author and Poet.
- Anthony Rolfe Johnson, Opera Singer.
- Gilbert Johnston, Chief Executive, JC Bamford
- Dilys Adrianne Meredith Jones, Director of Social Services, Birmingham City Council.
- Barbara Mary Kelly. For public service to the rural community in Scotland.
- Professor Arthur Colville Kennedy, President, the British Medical Association. For services to medicine.
- Raymond Reginald Knowland, Managing Director, British Petroleum
- David Ferguson Lewis, lately Grade 4, Deputy Chief Medical Officer, Welsh Office.
- Professor Trevor Lewis, Director of Research, Institute of Arable Crops Research, Agricultural and Food Research Council.
- Clive Hubert Lloyd. For services to Cricket and for public service in Lancashire.
- Christopher John Lowe, TD, Head Teacher, Prince William School, Oundle.
- Peter John Manser, Non-executive Member, Securities and Investments Board.
- Gordon Scott Marshall, lately Grade 5, Scottish Office.
- Bernard Trevor Matthews, Chairman, Bernard Matthews plc.
- Jean Alexandra McFadden, DL, President, Convention of Scottish Local Authorities. Deputy Leader, Glasgow District Council.
- Professor John Brian McFerran, lately Grade 5, Director of Veterinary. Sciences Division, Department of Agriculture, Northern Ireland.
- Robert William Roy McNulty, Managing Director and Chief Executive, Short Brothers plc.
- David Miles Middleton, lately President, Association of British Chambers of Commerce.
- Brian Leonard Mower, Grade 4, Foreign and Commonwealth Office.
- The Most Noble Anne Mary Teresa, Duchess of Norfolk, Founder and Co-Chairman, Help the Hospices.
- Ivor Henri Owen, Director-General, Design Council.
- Roger Carlton Paramor, Chief Officer, Essex County Fire and Rescue Service.
- Jeremy Leigh Pemberton, Deputy Chairman, Whatman plc.
- David Frost Pilkington. For services to the community in St. Helens.
- Trevor Pinnock, Harpsichordist and Conductor. Director, The English Concert.
- Professor Ernest John Christopher Polge, Director of Scientific Policy, Animal Biotechnology Cambridge Limited.
- Colonel Peter Michael Poole, TD DL, lately Chairman, North West of England and the Isle of Man Territorial Auxiliary and Volunteer Reserve Association.
- Mathew Caradoc Thomas Prichard, Chairman, Welsh Arts Council and Literary Consultant.
- John G. Ramsay, FRS, Professor of Geology, Eidgenossische Technische Hochschule, Zurich.
- Neville Truscott Rees, Grade 5, Department of Transport.
- Derek Frank Renn, lately Senior Actuary (A), Government Actuary's Department.
- Jack Rodin, Consultant, Building Design Partnership.
- John Anthony Rowntree, lately Grade 5, Office of Population, Censuses and Surveys.
- Anthony John Saint, Founder Member, Hertfordshire Training and Enterprise Council.
- Prunella Scales (Mrs. Timothy West), Actress.
- Roy Thomas Severn, Professor of Civil Engineering, University of Bristol.
- Brian Francis Shorney, lately Grade 4, Ministry of Agriculture, Fisheries and Food.
- Donald Tyrell Stewart, lately Chairman, Board of Governors, Dundee Institute of Technology.
- Peter Talbot. For political and public service.
- Anthony John Taylor, Chairman, Portsmouth and South East Hampshire Health Authority, Chairman, Management Side, General Whitley Council.
- Stefan Terlezki. For political and public service.
- David Hugh Thomas, Chief Executive, Mid-Glamorgan County Council.
- David Howard Palmer Tiptaft. For political and public service.
- Granville Richard Francis Tompkins. For charitable services.
- Peter Lawrence Towers, Registrar, General Medical Council.
- Wendy Toye. For services to the Arts.
- Roger George Whitehead, Director of the Medical Research Council's Dunn Nutrition Centre in Cambridge.
- Robin Lee Wilson, lately Chairman, Travers Morgan Consulting Group. President, Institution of Civil Engineers.
- Maurice Wohl, Founder, The Maurice Wohl Charitable Foundation and the Maurice Wohl Charitable Trust.
- David Massey Woodhall, lately Chief Executive, Commission for the New Towns.
- John Robert Chester Young, Chief Executive, Securities and Futures Authority.

==== Officer (OBE) ====
Military Division
Royal Navy

- Commander Mark Eric Wheler Bush.
- Commander Joseph Elder Fishwick.
- Commander Jeremy Glasson Hurlbatt.
- Local Lieutenant Colonel Brian Edward Alfred Seage, Royal Marines.
- Commander William Philip Shepherd.
- Commander Norman John Stone.
- Commander David Michael Tall.
- Commander Trevor Waddington.
- Commander Christopher Patrick Bache Welland.
- Local Lieutenant Colonel David Wilson, Royal Marines.
- Commander Robert Edward Woolgar.

Army

- Lieutenant Colonel Christopher John Biles, MBE (495321), The Devonshire and Dorset Regiment.
- Lieutenant Colonel Robin James Stirling Bullock-Webster (479182), Irish Guards.
- Lieutenant Colonel Charles William Manning Carter (491419), The Queen's Own Hussars.
- Lieutenant Colonel Philip Chaganis (487464), Royal Corps of Transport.
- Acting Lieutenant Colonel Keith Richard Cockman (426278), Army Cadet Force, Territorial Army.
- Lieutenant Colonel North John Frederick Dalrymple-Hamilton, TD (492841), The Queen's Own Yeomanry, Territorial Army.
- Lieutenant Colonel Andrew Lionel Dudley De Hoche Pied Larpent (491441),Royal Regiment of Fusiliers.
- Lieutenant Colonel Charles William Granville Dobbie (487480), The King's Own Scottish Borderers.
- Lieutenant Colonel Brian Nicholas Thomas Foxon, TD (484420), Royal Corps of Signals, Territorial Army.
- Lieutenant Colonel George Henry Harvey (501777), Small Arms School Corps.
- Lieutenant Colonel Ian George Henderson, TD (489132), Royal Corps of Signals, Territorial Army.
- Lieutenant Colonel Roger Nicholas Richmond Jenkins (484623), The Light Infantry.
- Lieutenant Colonel Timothy Vaughan Merritt (484913), The Royal Regiment of Fusiliers.
- Lieutenant Colonel Alan Keith McCulloch Miller (496219), The Argyll and Sutherland Highlanders (Princess Louise's).
- Lieutenant Colonel Francis Owens (499901), Royal Regiment of Artillery.
- Lieutenant Colonel Guy Nicholas Ranulph Sayle, MBE (480607), Welsh Guards.
- Lieutenant Colonel David Peter Stephenson (482900), Corps of Royal Engineers.
- Lieutenant Colonel Anthony Raymond Waitson (486342), Corps of Royal Engineers.

Royal Air Force

- Wing Commander Kenneth William Baldock (0593398).
- Wing Commander Peter Charles Butcher (4232848).
- Wing Commander Clive Richard Cooper (8022701).
- Wing Commander James Lloyd Davies (0507883).
- Wing Commander Peter John Dye (5202108).
- Wing Commander Antony John Featherstone (4179753).
- Wing Commander Brian Ward Price (2617699).
- Wing Commander Peter John Robbie (0608626).
- Wing Commander Michael John Russell (4233102).
- Wing Commander David Maurice Wesley (4335728).
- Wing Commander Malcolm Graham Forrester White (8025932).

Civil Division

- Nasim Ahmad, Managing Director, Port of Bristol Authority.
- Hedley William Arthur Alcock, Vice President, Youth Hostels Association.
- Professor Robin Carfrae Alston, Consultant in Bibliography, British Library.
- Olive Elizabeth Anderson, Chief Executive, Chesham Building Society.
- Julian Arkell, Consultant, British Invisibles.
- John Bailey. For services to Physical Education.
- Raymond Edwin Baker, Chairman, Fife Enterprise.
- Gordon Nelson Baldwin, Potter.
- James Jack Barbour, Chief Executive, Aberdeen Royal Hospitals NHS Trust.
- Barbara Grace Barnes. For political service.
- William James Barr, Chairman and Managing Director, Barr Limited.
- Peter Louis Belcher, lately Grade 6, Department of Transport.
- Martin Bell, Correspondent, British Broadcasting Corporation Television News.
- John Lonsdale Beton, Senior Patent Agent, Imperial Chemical Industries plc.
- Jack Penty Birch. For services to the community in York.
- Alan Blackshaw. For services to Mountaineering.
- John Jamieson Blanche, lately Member, Food From Britain Council.
- Caroline Una Bond, Chairman, Hospitals for Sick Children, Special Health Authority.
- Ian Terence Botham. For services to Cricket.
- Alan Frederick Boxford, Headmaster, Llanishen High School, Cardiff.
- Clive Brain, Principal, Swindon College.
- Malcolm Schofield Brigg, Grade 6, Department of Employment.
- Malcolm Brighton, Board Member, Milton Keynes Development Corporation.
- Brian Joseph Brogan, Grade 6, Department of Social Security.
- Daphne Elizabeth Brown, Director, Cleveland Branch, British Red Cross Society.
- Pamela Brown. For political and public service.
- Ian Loraine Buchanan, Arbitrator, Advisory, Conciliation and Arbitration Service (ACAS).
- Professor Ronald Hull Buchanan, Council Member, The National Trust and Chairman, Northern Ireland Regional Committee.
- Ronald Percy Bull, President, Machine Tools Technologies Association.
- Albert James Burger, Foreign and Commonwealth Office.
- Sybil Judith Chaplin. For political and public service.
- Stella Chitty, General Stage Manager, Royal Opera House.
- Jane Pamela Clark. For political and public service.
- Alan Michael Cleverly. For political service.
- Barrie John Collingridge, President, J. Collingridge. For services to Horticulture Marketing.
- Patricia Gay Collings, Headteacher, Sinfin Community School, Derbyshire.
- Geoffrey Cooke, Manager, England Rugby Union Team.
- James Ernest Dingwall Cormie, lately Chief Executive, Perth and Kinross District Council.
- Robert Coutts Crane, Managing Director, Belfast Telegraph Newspapers Limited.
- John Leonard Keith Croxton, Grade 6, Department of Social Security.
- Barbara Daly, Make-up Artist.
- Sheila Davidson, Secretary, Royal College of Midwives Scottish Board.
- Thomas Geraint Davies, Farmer. For services to Agriculture in Wales.
- Maurice John de Rohan, Founding Chairman, Herald Families' Association.
- William Maurice Denham, Actor.
- May Nugent Phyllis Dent, Member, Cheltenham Borough Council.
- Professor Susan Faunce Delaune Dev, Accounting Education.
- Polly Devlin, Author, Broadcaster and Film Writer.
- Patricia Ann Mary Diamond, Director, London Transport Medical Services.
- Douglas John Dunn, Managing Director, GEC-Plessey Semiconductors.
- Alan Eastwood, Chairman, Police Federation.
- Sandra Helen Elliott, Member, National Training Task Force.
- James Gerard Ewing, Chairman of Council, Glasgow College of Food Technology.
- Donald Leslie Ford, General Manager (The Americas) British Tourist Authority.
- Christopher Donald Fraser, Director of Operations, Northern Development Company.
- Dennis Allen George. For political service.
- Robert Myles Gibson, TD, Consultant Neurosurgeon, Leeds General Infirmary and St. James' University Hospital, Leeds.
- Pamela Gilbert, Deputy Head, Department of Library Services, Natural History Museum.
- Anthony Kent Giles, Professor of Farm Management, University of Reading.
- Richard Douglas Barrie Gillespie, Managing Director, Dartford River Crossing Limited.
- David Ivon Gower. For services to Cricket.
- Mary Kathleen Graves, Chairman of Trustees, Tudor Trust.
- Peter John Felix Griffiths, Chief Regional Scientific Adviser, No.8 Civil Defence Region, Civil Defence Organisation.
- Michael Simon Hacker, lately Grade 6, Department of Education and Science.
- Dennis Hamill Hagan, Vice President, European Federation of Animal Health.
- Stanley Frederick Hall, Director of Engineering, Rotherham Metropolitan Borough Council.
- Martin John Harper, Chairman, Minories Finance Limited.
- Wilhelmine Margaret Eve, Lady Harrod, President, Norfolk Churches Trust.
- John Nigel Hawks. For political service.
- Robert Barclay Heaton, Architect. For services to Welsh Architectural Heritage.
- Peter Hugh Herbert, Grade 7.
- Ruth Marian Hicks, Science Director, United Biscuits (UK) Limited. For services to the development of Toxicology.
- Philip Vazeille Hills, Grade 6, Department of Trade and Industry.
- Barbara Lambton Holland, President, All England Women's Hockey Association.
- Richard Holmes, Writer.
- Bryan Thomas Hughes, Head Teacher, De Ferrers High School, Burton-upon-Trent, Staffordshire.
- Agnes Stevenson, Lady Humphrey. For services to the community in Gloucestershire.
- M. Yousaf Inait. For services to race relations in Scotland.
- Stewart Morris John, Engineering Director, Cathay Pacific Airways.
- John Todd Kellett, lately County Secretary and Solicitor, Cheshire County Council.
- Richard John Kent, House Governor, The London Clinic.
- Frank Kenward. For services to the community in Dorking, Surrey.
- Margaret Buchanan Kernohan, lately Senior Legal Assistant, Crown Office and Procurator Fiscal Service, Scottish Office.
- George Kidney, Director, Balcas Timber Limited and President of Northern Ireland Home Timber Merchants Association.
- William Kilgallon, Chief Executive, St. Anne's Shelter and Housing Action, Leeds.
- Roger James Kingsley, Chairman, University of Manchester Institute of Science and Technology Ventures Limited.
- Jozefina Nowotna-Lachowicka, Member, Executive Council, the British Refugee Council.
- Diana Elizabeth Lamplugh, Founder, The Suzy Lamplugh Trust.
- Stuart Martin Latham, Brigade Secretary, Headquarters, St. John Ambulance Brigade, London.
- David Franklyn Lawrence, Managing Director, Digital Equipment (Scotland) Limited.
- Sybil Levin. For services to the community in Nottingham.
- John Christopher Lewis, Member of Board of Visitors, Her Majesty's Prison, Lewes.
- John Alan Loarridge, Headteacher, Dr. Challoner's Grammar School, Amersham, Buckinghamshire.
- Graham Locke, Headmaster, Audenshaw High School, Tameside, Manchester.
- Anthony Craig Longden, Managing Director, Croda Hydrocarbons Limited.
- David Michael Lush, Technical Director, Ove Arup Partnership.
- Andrew MacMillan, Professor of Architecture, University of Glasgow. Head of Mackintosh School of Architecture.
- John MacVicar, Regional Emergency Planning Officer, Strathclyde Regional Council.
- John Rowland Mallard, lately Professor of Medical Physics, University of Aberdeen and Director of Medical Physics Grampian Health Board.
- Anthony Francis Norris Maloney, lately Chief Investigation Officer, Ministry of Agriculture, Fisheries and Food.
- Charles Trevor Massey, Head of Supply and Contracts Department, British Coal Corporation. Director, I.E.A. Coal Research.
- Dominic McCauley, lately Convener, West Lothian District Council.
- Daniel McGeachie, Director and General Manager, Government and Public Affairs, Conoco (Uk) Limited.
- Florence Mary Philomena McMahon, Principal, St. Mary's High School, Newry, Co. Down.
- Ronald McMillan. For political service.
- Paul Henry McWilliams, Chairman, BIS Information Systems Limited. Chairman, NI2000 and Chairman, Software Industry Federation.
- Eric Clare Midwinter, Chairman, London Regional Passengers' Committee.
- Hazel May Miller, Regional Director of Nursing, Trent Regional Health Authority.
- Rosalie Vivien Gresham Monbiot. For political and public service.
- Stephen Morgan, Founder and Chairman, Redrow Group Limited.
- Linda Morley. For political service.
- Michael Charles Morris, Associate Director and Chief Engineer, Rutherford Appleton Laboratory.
- Clive Neil Morton, Director, Personnel and Administration, Komatsu (UK) Limited.
- John Trevor Morton. For services to industrial relations nationally and internationally.
- Bernard Albert Mouzer, Assistant Chief Probation Officer, West Midlands.
- John Murphy, lately Grade 7, Observer Captain, Royal Observer Corps, Bentley Priory.
- Renee Myers, Chairman, Brent and Harrow Family Health Services Authority.
- John Easter Newman, Director, Biscuit, Cake, Chocolate and Confectionery Alliance.
- Ian Martin Nicol, Headteacher, Balerno Community High School, Midlothian.
- Rosemary Frances Theresa Nockolds, Foreign and Commonwealth Office.
- Janet Hume Notman, Conservation Officer, The Burrell Collection, Glasgow.
- John Francis O'Sullivan, DL, Consultant Obstetrician and Gynaecologist, Belfast City and Royal Maternity Hospitals.
- Michael John Oldroyd, Secretary, Inner London Local Medical Committees.
- Michael John Painter, Marketing Director, Matra-Marconi Space UK Limited.
- Donald Charles Palmer. For services to Schools' Association Football.
- Robert Victor Baird-Parker, Leader Gedling Borough Council.
- Alexander Davidson Patterson, Chief Telecommunications Engineer, Police Authority for Northern Ireland.
- David Eric Pedgley, Grade 6, Overseas Development Administration.
- Zbigniew Andrzej Pelczynski. For services to Anglo-Polish Co-operation.
- Patrick Thomas Gordon-Duff-Pennington, MBE. For services to Agriculture in Scotland.
- Mohammed Anwar Pervez, Chairman, Bestway (Holdings) Limited.
- John Pigott. For political service.
- The Reverend Robert Frederick Shane Poots, Chairman, North Eastern Education and Library Board, Northern Ireland.
- Bryan Llewelyn Powell, lately Director, Open University, Wales.
- John Gerard Poyner, lately, Director, Social Services, Wigan.
- Peter Prichard. For services to the Order of St. John and to the Entertainment Artistes' Benevolent Fund.
- Kenneth William Pritchard, Secretary, The Law Society of Scotland.
- Stephen Race, Broadcaster, musician and author.
- (Antony) Christopher Ralling, Freelance writer and director.
- Ralph Phillip Vinson Rees, Joint Senior Partner, (South Wales) Coopers and Lybrand.
- William Hawkridge Roberts, Manager, National Centre of Tribology, Risley, AEA Technology.
- Malcolm Ross, Chief Nursing Officer, Oxfordshire Health Authority.
- Lieutenant Colonel Kenneth William Sear, lately General Secretary, the Soldiers' and Airmen's Scripture Readers Association.
- Dorothy Selleck, Grade 6, Welsh Office.
- Helen Patricia Sharman, Astronaut, JUNO mission and Consultant, Serco Space Limited.
- Cedric Philip Sharp, Head of Design, Hunting Engineering Limited, Ampthill.
- Michael Sharratt, Occupational Health and Toxicology Adviser, Robens Institute of Health and Safety, University of Surrey.
- Roger Barrett Simpson, Commercial Director and Secretary, West Yorkshire Passenger Transport Executive.
- Cyril Andrew Sinclair. For services to Marine Engineering.
- Charles Pipe Skene. For political and public service.
- Thomas Keith Slade, Head Teacher, The West of England School for Children with Little or No Sight, Countess Wear, Exeter.
- Bruce Gordon Smith, Chairman, Smith Associates Limited.
- Frank Barry Smith, lately Grade 7, Ministry of Defence.
- Thomas Henry Snee, Nursing Officer, Department of Health.
- Antony Peter Somers, Associate Director (Planning), Dan-Air Services. Chairman, Gatwick Scheduling Committee.
- Stanley Grainger Sparkes, Political Editor, Birmingham Evening Mail.
- Roland Eric Stafford. For services to Motability and to the Disabled.
- Valerie Ann Stead, Deputy Director, Thames Polytechnic.
- Rupert Paul Steele, Grade 7, Department of Energy.
- Shirley Pamela Stotter. For political service.
- Julian Piers Stretch, Chairman, Trade Advisory Committee for South Asia. For services to Export.
- Richard Sydney Taylor, Director, Wellman Booth.
- Dorothy Dene Thomas. For political service.
- Vivian Elliott Sgrifan Thomas, Chief Executive, BP Oil UK Limited.
- Rosemary Edith Robertson Thomson, Deputy Chairman, Council of the Magistrates' Association.
- The Reverend Bernard George Thorogood, General Secretary, United Reformed Church.
- Julian Jacob Tobin. For political and public service.
- Trevor Truman, Engineering Director, Royal Ordnance plc, Westcott.
- John Turnbull, lately National Fruit Specialist, Agricultural Development and Advisory Services.
- John Russell Turner, lately Assistant Director, Countryside Commission for Scotland.
- Major Bruce Urquhart, Forestry Consultant.
- Jean Varnam. For public service in Nottinghamshire.
- Richard Blakeney Wade, Managing Director, The Jersey Electricity Company Limited.
- Kelvin Raymond Walker. For political service.
- Barbara Lynn Wallis (Mrs. Derek Oakley). For political service.
- Alexandra Jane Ward, Grade 7, Ministry of Defence.
- Joseph Ward, Head of School of Vocal Studies, Royal Northern College of Music.
- Mavis Joan Webster, Grade 7, Department of Employment.
- Simon Weston. Founder, The Weston Spirit.
- Vivienne Westwood. For services to Fashion Design.
- John Peter Whitehouse, Member, National Curriculum Council. Member, School Examinations and Assessment Council.
- Paul Anthony Whitehouse, Governor, Her Majesty's Young Offenders' Institution, Deerbolt.
- Heather Mary Williams, Deputy to the Registrar, United Kingdom Central Council for Nursing, Midwifery and Health Visiting.
- Margaret Fay Williams, Chairman, West Glamorgan Probation Committee.
- Alan Donald Wilson. For services to the dental profession.
- The Reverend Kenneth Brian Wilson, Principal, Westminster College, Oxford.
- Eve Wiltshaw, Consultant Cancer Physician and Director of Clinical Services, Royal Marsden Hospital.
- David James Withers, Consultant in Satellite Communications.
- Leslie John Woodhead, Freelance Producer, Television Documentary Drama.
- John Irvin Wooley, Director of Fuel Procurement, PowerGen plc.
- Canon William Hutchinson Wright. For services to industry in Teesside.
- John McDonald Young, Chairman, British Deaf Association.

==== Member (MBE) ====
Military Division

Royal Navy

- Lieutenant Commander Paul Barton.
- Warrant Officer Maurice Bessant.
- Lieutenant Commander Richard John Brunwin.
- Lieutenant Commander David Peter Collyer.
- Lieutenant Commander Colin John de Mowbray.
- Lieutenant Commander David Dennis, RD, Royal Naval Reserve.
- Warrant Officer Elizabeth Helen Hadley.
- Captain James Roy Hancock, Royal Marines.
- Lieutenant Commander David Blaise Hosking.
- Warrant Officer Arthur Garnet James Little.
- Warrant Officer 2 (CAS) David Robinson Logue, Royal Marines.
- Lieutenant Michael Marshall.
- Lieutenant Commander Rodney Frank Smith.
- Lieutenant Commander Clive Wakefield.
- Acting Lieutenant Tudor Lloyd Woolman, Royal Marines.
- Lieutenant Commander Michael John Wright.

Army

- 24317301 Warrant Officer Class 2 John Nigel Adlington, Corps of Royal Engineers.
- 24240114 Warrant Officer Class 2 Richard Douglas Allamby, Royal Corps of Transport.
- Major Robert Mitchell Allen (499275), Royal Army Medical Corps.
- Major Stephen Michael Andrews (501545), Royal Electrical and Mechanical Engineers.
- Major Richard Robert Arthur (508994), The Parachute Regiment.
- Major Julian Duncan Bower (503761), Royal Regiment of Artillery.
- Major Malcolm Douglas Cherry (489950), Royal Corps of Signals.
- 22905946 Warrant Officer Class 2 John Devanney, Army Catering Corps, Territorial Army.
- 23253376 Warrant Officer Class 1 Raymond Dickinson, Royal Regiment of Artillery.
- 24258472 Warrant Officer Class 1 (now Lieutenant (538999)) Tony Robin Farrow, The Queen's Regiment.
- Major Jonathan Stuart Butler Frere (491005), Royal Army Ordnance Corps.
- Major Stuart Graham, TD (517436), Corps of Royal Military Police, Territorial Army.
- Major Thomas Syme Graham (515161), Royal Army Veterinary Corps.
- Major Peter Hannam, BEM (508624), Welsh Guards.
- Captain John Charles Hewitson, TD (493919), The Parachute Regiment, Territorial Army.
- 24283756 Warrant Officer Class 1 David Richardson Hill, Royal Regiment of Artillery.
- Major Peter Hollerhead, TD (504222), Corps of Royal Engineers, Territorial Army.
- Major Robert James Jordan (501622), The Royal Hampshire Regiment.
- Major George Andrew Kilburn (497450), The Duke of Wellington's Regiment.
- Major Michael Alan Lauder (499738), Corps of Royal Engineers.
- 23594400 Warrant Officer Class 1 John Keith Lincoln, Royal Army Dental Corps.
- Major (Acting Lieutenant Colonel) Hamish Lister Armitage McDonald (495366), 1st The Queen's Dragoon Guards.
- Major Murdo Macleod (517396), Queen's Own Highlanders (Seaforth and Camerons).
- 23868784 Warrant Officer Class 2 Harold Merritt, King's Own Royal Border Regiment.
- Captain (Acting Major) Nicholas Crispin Moody (515395), Corps of Royal Engineers.
- Major Jonathan Graeme Mullin (502469), Corps of Royal Engineers.
- Major Robert Barry Paddison (487556), The Duke of Edinburgh's Royal Regiment (Berkshire and Wiltshire).
- 24305012 Warrant Officer Class 2 Michael Henry Pays, Royal Army Ordnance Corps.
- Captain (Acting Major) Mark Jonathan Perry (509566), Royal Corps of Signals.
- Major Richard John Powell, CD (610-184-335), Canadian Armed Forces.
- Major Roland Joseph Weitman Bunch Proctor (517678), The Black Watch (Royal Highland Regiment).
- Major George Reed (519444), Royal Regiment of Artillery, Territorial Army.
- Major Paul James Rennie (496895), The King's Own Scottish Borderers.
- Acting Major Norman John Rowe (367945), Army Cadet Force, Territorial Army.
- Major John Sands (510194), The Royal Scots (The Royal Regiment).
- 24247256 Warrant Officer Class 1 Philip David Shannon, The Royal Regiment of Wales (24th/41st Foot).
- Acting Captain John Anthony Smith (519454), Army Cadet Force, Territorial Army.
- Major Robin Charles Swanson (498202), Corps of Royal Engineers.
- Major David Timlin (512108), Royal Horse Artillery.
- Captain (Acting Major) Jonathan Peter Watkinson, (512696), Corps of Royal Engineers.
- 24212666 Warrant Officer Class 1 Dennis Arthur Westaway, Corps of Royal Electrical and Mechanical Engineers.
- 24241707 Warrant Officer Class 2 William George White, The Queen's Regiment, Territorial Army.
- Major Keith Wotton, TD (487611), The Parachute Regiment, Territorial Army.
- Major Jeremy Humfrey Hutton York (478162), The Light Infantry.

Royal Air Force

- Squadron Leader Paul Stuart Giles Adams (4233057).
- Squadron Leader Gerald Almond (0592109), (Retired).
- Warrant Officer Patrick Joseph Anderson (C1950272).
- Warrant Officer Terence Charles Clifton (Q1947977).
- Squadron Leader William Russell Couston (4276261), Royal Air Force Volunteer Reserve (Training).
- Squadron Leader Michael Stuart Dean (0686302).
- Flight Lieutenant John Christopher Gardiner (0595449).
- Squadron Leader Peter John Hearn (4232602).
- Warrant Officer Derek Gerald Hobden (U0592827), (Retired).
- Warrant Officer William Charles Jones (El960827).
- Squadron Leader Robert John Merriman Kemp (5203406), Royal Air Force Regiment.
- Squadron Leader John Crow Kennedy (4249472), Royal Air Force Volunteer Reserve (Training).
- Squadron Leader David Alexander Knight (5202301).
- Reverend (Squadron Leader) Andrew Harry John Lane (5203832).
- Squadron Leader John McCourt (4201833).
- Master Aircrew Alistair David John Mackie (C0686681).
- Warrant Officer David Pirnie McLauchlan (J4245882).
- Squadron Leader Matthew McShane (3519913), Royal Air Force Volunteer Reserve (Training) (Retired).
- Master Aircrew Nicholas John Newton (R8018844).
- Warrant Officer Desmond Joseph O'Hara (L1935571).
- Warrant Officer Anthony John Peterson (L4280102).
- Squadron Leader Malcolm Hamlyn Rush (0506190).
- Squadron Leader Annabel Smith (2833954), Women's Royal Air Force.
- Warrant Officer Edward Albert Ward (J4165935), (Retired).
- Warrant Officer Michael Kevin Willetts (N0690063).

Civil Division

- Mohammed Akbar Ali. For political service.
- David Gillespie Anderson, Divisional Officer, Fife Fire and Rescue Service.
- Charles Anthony Arkell, lately Chief Engineer, Supertension Cables, Energy Cables Division, BICC Cables Limited.
- Margaret Arnold. For services to the community in Brierfield, Lancashire.
- Harry Ashcroft. For services to the community in Hemel Hempstead, Hertfordshire.
- Herman Heinrich Baarda. For services to Horticulture.
- Kathleen Bail, Higher Executive Officer, Department of Employment.
- Jonathan Macartney Ball, Principal, The Jonathan Ball Practice.
- Julian Andrew Ball, Counters Manager (1), The Post Office, Office Counters District Office, Oxford.
- George William Bambrough, Chairman, Conference and Exhibitions Committee, Institute of Plumbing. Master, Worshipful Company of Plumbers.
- Peter Henry Banham, Consultant Geologist, lately Member of Council, English Nature.
- Doreen May Barden, Valuation Technician, Board of Inland Revenue.
- Mary Burch Barker, Weaver. For services to Textile Crafts.
- Owen John Barnes, Director, Healthcare Standards, Barking, Havering and Brentwood Health Authority.
- Donald Robert Barron, Chief Scientist, Electro-Optics Division, Thorn-EMI Electronics Limited.
- Sheila Barrows, Member, North West Surrey Community Health Council. Chairman, Friends of Brookwood Hospital.
- Gurdip Singh Bedi, Export Finance Director, Export and Projects Department, Barclays Bank plc.
- Ursula Beeny, Higher Executive Officer, Lord Chancellor's Department.
- Edward Keith Bickley, Senior Divisional Officer, Merseyside Fire Brigade.
- Francis George Stonehewer Bird, Personnel and Training Adviser, British Hospitality Association.
- Michael John Bishop, Higher Executive Officer, Ministry of Defence.
- Joseph Blackledge, lately Deputy Director, Associated Colleges of Newman and Westhill, Birmingham.
- Dorothy Irene Blackmore. For services to the community in Bristol.
- James Patrick Bogan, Deputy Principal, Department of Health and Social Services, Northern Ireland.
- John Bosworth. For political service.
- Robert Braithwaite, Chairman and Managing Director, Sunseeker International (Powerboats) Limited. For services to Export.
- David Harold Bright, Chief Inspector, Essex Police.
- Jeffrey Charles Broadhurst, Design Director Advanced Products, Dowty Woodville Polymer Fabrications Limited.
- Mary Lillian Broadhurst, General Manager, Maternity and Gynaecology Services, Queen Mary's Hospital, Bexley.
- Donald Broadley, Chief Engineer, Fast Reactor Division, NNC Limited.
- Dorothy May Bruce. For services to the community in Marlow, Buckinghamshire.
- Geoffrey Busby, Chairman, British Computer Society's Disability Programme. Associate Director, The Computability Centre.
- Winifred Busfield. For services to music and for charitable services.
- Henry Alfred Butler, Scientific Officer, Warren Spring Laboratory, Department of Trade and Industry.
- Patricia Mary Byass. For services to the community in Little Weighton, East Yorkshire.
- John Stuart Cameron, Needle-Exchange Co-ordinator, Greater Glasgow Health Board.
- George Paxton Campbell. For services to the community in Newcastle upon Tyne.
- Philip John Carter, Manager, Mental Handicap Nursing, Newcastle upon Tyne.
- Barry James Champion, Divisional Director (Finance), Chester Site, British Aerospace plc.
- Margot Chapman, Honorary Secretary, Kingston upon Thames Division, Soldiers', Sailors' and Airmen's Families Association.
- Rowland Robert Charlton. For services to the community in Hexham, Northumberland.
- The Reverend Alexander Chestnut, Senior Church of Scotland Chaplain, Her Majesty's Prison, Greenock.
- Wilma Clark, Recreational Therapist, Woodilee Hospital, Glasgow.
- Ramon David Cliffe, Chairman, Ministry of Defence Council of Civil Service Unions.
- Eric Maurice Cohen. For services to the community in Southend on Sea.
- Lieutenant Commander Richard Frederick Colville, DSC. For political and public service.
- Christina Bain Conacher, Honorary Vice Chairman, Kingston Royal Society for Mentally Handicapped Children and Adults.
- Graham Victor Connett, Factory Manager, Remploy Limited, Cleator Moor, Cumbria.
- Anthony Conway, Head of Roads and Environment, Scotland and Northern Ireland, Automobile Association.
- Emmanuel Hercules Cotter, Executive Director, North London Business Development Agency.
- Evelyn Olive Courtney, lately Film Librarian, Ulster Television.
- Jean Cox, Leader, Daventry District Council.
- Patricia Ann Cox. For services to the community in Dursley, Gloucestershire.
- Samuel Joseph Ronald Cox, Security Investigator, Department of Finance and Personnel, Northern Ireland.
- Beryl Patricia Craven, Senior Executive Officer, Department of the Environment.
- Major Anthony John Wallace Crombie (Rtd.), Vice Chairman, The Bath Society.
- Margaret Crossan. For political service.
- Kenneth Edward Dale. For political and public service.
- Nita Dally. For services to the community in Barry, South Glamorgan.
- Captain Douglas Logie Davidson, Shipmaster, Shell Marine Personnel (IOM) Limited.
- Barbara Berta Davies, Senior Executive Officer, Department of Transport.
- James Allen Davies. For political and public service.
- Pamela Evelyn Davis. For services to Skating.
- John Francis Denny, Line Revenue Protection Manager, London Underground Limited.
- Iain Walter Dobson, Chief Executive, Campaign for Real Ale.
- William Harry Dove, Director, Attlee Foundation.
- Sheila Vere Dunbar, Joint Chairman, Executive Committee, Children's Country Holiday Fund.
- Cecil Arthur Durston, Stone Mason. For services to the community in Portland, Dorset.
- Sylvia Pearl Elliott, Sister, Newcourt Hospital, Exeter.
- Peter Lionel Erridge, Associate Specialist in Dental Surgery, Special Needs Unit, Guy's Dental Hospital.
- Alcwyn Evans, Professional and Technology Officer, Royal Mint.
- Gerald Richard Evans, Professional and Technology Officer, Ministry of Defence.
- Ian Michael Evans. For services to nature conservation in Leicestershire.
- Captain James Evans, RD. For political and public service.
- John Walter Eversley, Director and General Manager, Tyne and Wear Enterprise Trust Limited.
- Eileen Marion Eves, lately Higher Executive Officer, Prime Minister's Office.
- John Fairweather, Fund Raising Co-ordinator, Vale of Glamorgan Branch, The Guide Dogs for the Blind Association.
- Samuel Vincent Fay, lately Journalist, Matlock Mercury, Derbyshire.
- Albert Fidler, President, Bracknell Unit of the Sea Cadet Corps.
- Raymond Austin Joseph Field, Head of Administration, Engineers Department, Birmingham City Council.
- Sidney Roy Fisher, DL. For services to youth and to the community in Lancashire.
- Kate Marinel Fitzsimons, Secretary, Royal Society for Asian Affairs.
- Benjamin Foot. For services to the Save the Children Fund in Asia and East Africa.
- Anna Mary Forshaw, Clinical Nurse Specialist (Thermal Injury), Booth Hall Hospital, Manchester.
- Betty Foster, For services to the community in Crewe, Cheshire.
- Malcolm Muir Fraser, Sewage Works Manager, Northumbrian Water Limited.
- Bernard Derek Frutin, Chairman and Managing Director, Rocep Lusol Holdings Limited and Rocep Pressure Packs Limited. Glasgow.
- Graham Fredrick Mozart Fuller, Chief Executive and Secretary, Wood Green Animal Shelters.
- Edward Arthur Gage. For services to the arts in Scotland.
- Susan Mary Geary, Executive Officer, Board of Customs and Excise.
- Ursula Rose Ginger. For services to the Dorset Pre-School Playgroups Association.
- Keith Edward Goddard, Development and Training Manager, Midlands Electricity plc.
- Mary Elaine Gough, Headteacher, Glan-Yr-Afon Nursery School, Cardiff.
- John Gould, Vice President, Kennet and Avon Canal Trust.
- Honor Joyce Graham, lately Member, London Borough of Ealing Council.
- Jeffrey Grayshon. For services to Rugby League Football.
- Joyce Greely, Executive Officer, Department of Social Security.
- John Duncan Green, Construction Manager, Trafalgar House Construction Management Limited. For services to Export.
- John William Greening. For services to the community in Oxford.
- Edwin Bernard Griffith, President and Branch Secretary, Canvey Island Branch, Royal National Lifeboat Institution.
- Ian Malcolm Griffiths, TD, lately Senior Executive, Community Relations, National Westminster Bank plc.
- John Alun Griffiths, Area Superintendent, English Heritage, Carlisle.
- Beverley Iris Gull. For services to sport for the disabled.
- Lieutenant Commander John Haffenden, Royal Navy (Retired), lately Director, British Naval Equipment Association.
- Samuel Hall, Deputy District Commissioner, St. John Ambulance Brigade.
- Alice Teresa Harding, Chief Superintendent, Durham Constabulary.
- Bernard Gilmour Hart, Honorary Secretary, Dorset Grassland Society.
- Alan Hartley, Colliery Manager, British Coal Corporation.
- Henry Campbell Henderson, Governor 3, Scottish Prison Service Headquarters, Edinburgh.
- Janet McRae Heyes, General Medical Practitioner Liverpool.
- Anthony Chadbourne Heywood, lately Legal Officer, Union of Shop, Distribution and Allied Workers (USDAW).
- Eric William Hibberd. For services to Tourism on the Isle of Wight.
- James Richard Clinton Higgins. For services to the British Film Industry.
- Mary Higgs. For services to Obstetrics and Gynaecology and to the community in Worthing.
- Trevor Gordon Hill, Chairman, Humberside Energy Management Group.
- Evelyn Louisa Hinton. For political and public service.
- Evelyn Hirst, Principal Fire Control Officer, Bedfordshire Fire and Rescue Service.
- Margaret June Hobbs, lately Higher Executive Officer, Department of Social Security.
- Katherine Cornish Hobdell, Co-ordinator, Islington Victim Support Scheme.
- Ronald Arthur Hoblyn, Forest Officer III, Forestry Commission.
- Jean May Hodge, Co-ordinator, St. John Fellowship, Somerset.
- Bernard John Holden, Chairman and Director, The Bluebell Railway plc.
- Norah Margaret Holden, Senior Executive Officer, Home Office.
- William Holden, lately Production Director, CV Home Furnishings Limited.
- Sylvia Holgate, Executive Officer, National Audit Office.
- Edith Mary Holland. For services to the Amateur Athletic Association of England.
- Helen Evelyn Honeyman, Co-ordinator, Harmony Community Trust, Northern Ireland.
- Madeleine Gladys Hopley, Chairman, Staffordshire Housing Association.
- Fritz Ehler Wilhelm Hormann, Farmer. For services to Agriculture in Wales.
- Margaret Mary Howe. For political and public service.
- Ronald Arthur Hoy. For services to nursing education.
- Robert John (Ron) Hunt, lately Editor of the Diss Express, Norfolk.
- Nancy Hunter-Gray, Founder, the Foundation for the Study of Infant Deaths.
- Gregory John David Hurley, Higher Executive Officer, Ministry of Defence.
- Arthur James Hutchinson, Chairman, Spitalfields Market Tenants' Association.
- James Grant Innes, Honorary Treasurer, Watford Branch, Arthritis Care.
- Elizabeth Shirley Iwanyckyj, Headteacher, Barnby Dun First School, Doncaster.
- William Murray Jack. For services to the built heritage in Scotland.
- Betty Jackson, Organiser, Books on Wheels, Devon Women's Royal Voluntary Service.
- Frank Jackson, Chairman, Jackson Group of Companies.
- Paul Jacobs. For political service.
- Shirin Kersey Jasavala, Senior Personal Secretary, Department of Energy.
- Delia Jenkins, Typing Manager, Metropolitan Police.
- Anthony Jones, Chief Executive, Stockport Family Health Services Authority.
- Grace Anstice Jones, Deputy Principal, Chester College of Higher Education.
- Graham Howard Jones, Senior Executive Officer, Welsh Office.
- Ahmed Kamal, Higher Executive Officer, Science and Engineering Research Council.
- Gladys Dorothy Kavell. For political service.
- Barbara Cecil Keen, Life President, British Herb Trade Association.
- John Walton Kellaway, Chairman, Liverpool Personal Service Society.
- Robert Roger Kelly, Site Manager (Simon Carves Limited) for the PLC Installation, Yerevan Armenia. For services to Export.
- Alan Campbell Kennedy, Honorary Secretary and Treasurer, Scottish River Purification Boards' Association.
- Eileen Marguerite Kennedy, Catering Manager, Queen's University, Belfast.
- Edna Valerie Kimber, lately Senior Secretary to the Chairman, Imperial Chemical Industries plc.
- Henry Kirk, President, Royal Air Force Regiment, South East Asia Comm and Association.
- Patricia Mary Laurent, lately Chief Typing Manager, Department of Employment.
- Dennis Robert Ledgard, Battalion President, North Wales Boy's Brigade.
- Percy Reginald Levy. For political and public service.
- Reginald Price Lewis. For services to the community in Hay-on-Wye, Herefordshire.
- Nona Patricia Liddell (Mrs. MacMahon), Principal First Violin, London Sinfonietta.
- Ronald William Lindsay, Manager, Operational Contingencies and Control, British Airways plc.
- Eleanor Elizabeth Lloyd, Principal Medical Laboratory Scientific Officer, Department of Haematology, Royal Postgraduate Medical School, Hammersmith, London.
- Morcom Lunt, lately Chairman, Manufacturing Division, Institution of Electrical Engineers.
- David Lynch, Senior Executive Officer, Board of Customs and Excise.
- Angus Cameron MacDonald, Head, Building Department, Clydebank College of Further Education.
- Callum MacDonald. For services to Scottish Literary Publishing.
- Donald Roderick MacDonald, Principal Teacher of Gaelic, Portree High School, Isle of Skye.
- Flora MacNeil (Mrs. Macinnes), Traditional Gaelic Singer.
- Anne Mallinson, Headmistress, Nortonthorpe Hall (Residential School), Huddersfield.
- Bernald Mallows, College Safety Officer, University of Wales, Cardiff.
- Demetrios Markou. For political service.
- David Anthony McAuley. For services to Boxing.
- Samuel James McCammick, Alderman, Craigavon Borough Council, Northern Ireland.
- Georgina Joyce McCartan, Co-ordinator, Women's Information Drop-in Centre, Belfast.
- Cynthia Mary McDowall, President, National Federation of Consumer Groups.
- John Findlay McFadzean, Contracts Director, Major Projects Division/A55 Conwy Crossing Scheme, Tarmac Construction.
- John McGilly, Higher Executive Officer, Department of Social Security.
- Sarah Elizabeth McKee, Sister in Charge, Dermatology Outpatients Department, Royal Victoria Hospital, Belfast.
- Dennis John McKinney, Managing Director, Kent Plastics UK Limited.
- John Mervyn McKissick, Professional and Technology Officer, Property Services Agency.
- George Sherret McLean, Chief Superintendent, Tayside Police.
- Joyce Catherine Meares, Senior Personal Secretary, Department of Employment.
- Elsie Lily Menzies. For services to the community in Cumnock.
- William Miller, Manager (Marketing), Offshore, Linepipe and Shipbuilding, British Steel plc.
- Ann Milling, Chairman, Supportive Help Against Drug Organisations.
- Robert Hughes Milne. For services to the Fish Processing Industry in Scotland.
- Elizabeth Mitchell, Health Visitor, Oxfordshire Health Authority.
- Angus Morgan. For services to Salmon Farming in Scotland.
- Ann Lea Morris. For services to the community in Harrogate.
- Michael Mainwaring Morton, Chairman, Brunswick Boys' Club Trust, London.
- John Ernest Unsworth Moxon, General Medical Practitioner, Frome, Somerset.
- Brian Charles Edward Mumford, lately Professional and Technology Officer, Ministry of Agriculture, Fisheries and Food.
- David Narey. For services to Association Football in Scotland.
- Captain Roy John Noyes, Fleet Captain, Ministry of Agriculture, Fisheries and Food Surveillance Aircraft.
- Melville Samuel Nunley, lately Technical Co-operation Officer, Agricultural Education and Training.
- Ralph Arthur Parkin, Sales and Marketing Director, TSL Group plc. For services to Export.
- Anthony Richard Parr, Senior Divisional Officer, Kent Fire Brigade. Channel Tunnel Project Officer.
- June Constance Paul, Executive Officer, Health and Safety Executive.
- Squadron Leader Francis William Payne (Ret'd.), President, Horsham Branch, Royal Air Forces Association.
- Audrey Primrose Pestell, Headteacher, The Shepherd School, Nottingham.
- Anthony John Pilgrim, lately Honorary Secretary, Royal Television Society.
- Kathleen Anne Rose Plasins, Nursing Officer, District Nursing and Geriatric Liaison, West Sussex.
- Gordon Polley. For services to the community in North Humberside.
- Sandra Pollock, Personal Assistant to Chairman and Chief Executive, Scottish Enterprise.
- Pauline Prestidge. For services to Gymnastics.
- Thomas Sydney Preston, Director, Information Services, British Railways Board.
- Elisabeth Marion Price, Manager (Environment), UK Agricultural Supply Trade Association Limited.
- Nargis Rashid, Governor Training Co-ordinator, Birmingham Education Department.
- Mary Raven, lately Secretary to the Chairman, British Aerospace plc.
- Peter Reardon, Paymaster, Powys Health Authority.
- Michael Ben Redman, Senior Professional and Technology Officer, Ministry of Defence.
- Neil Anderson Reid, President, National League of the Blind and Disabled.
- Albert Frederick Riggs. For services to the Plymouth and District National Association of Retired Police Officers.
- Ewart Percival Roach. For political service.
- Jane Gray Roberts, Director of Nursing, Ross Hall Hospital, Glasgow.
- Leon Joseph Rogan, Probation Officer, Probation Board for Northern Ireland.
- James Joseph Rooney, Instrument and Electrical Maintenance Engineer, Northern Ireland Electricity.
- Dora Margaret Ross, Chairman, Hastings Health Authority.
- Finlay John Ross, Local Officer I, Department of Social Security.
- Robert George Ruddell, Chief Superintendent, Royal Ulster Constabulary.
- Mary Jean Russell, Secretary, Universities Council for the Education of Teachers.
- Eunice Florence Salmond. For services to the community in Douglas, Isle of Man.
- Anne Winifred Samson, Higher Executive Officer, Department of Employment.
- Deborah Jane Geraldine de Satge. For political service.
- Julia Mary Schofield, Managing Director, Julia Schofield Consultants Limited.
- Andrew Simpson Scott, Vice Chairman, South East Scotland, War Pensioners' Committee.
- Michael William Scott. For political service.
- John Eric Searson. For political service.
- Dorothy Elizabeth Selby, Support Manager 1 (Reprographics Manager), Ministry of Defence.
- David Anthony Shaw, Higher Executive Officer, Department of Social Security.
- John Henry Sheard. For services to the community in Leeds.
- Janet Mary Shearman, Supervisor of Housing Managers, Church Commissioners for England, Octavia Hill Estates, London.
- Brian Shillcock, Personnel and Training Manager, Dunlop Limited.
- Dorothy Marion Silberston. For services to the National Schizophrenia Fellowship.
- Ellen Skehan, Executive Officer, Committees and General Section, Natural Environment Research Council.
- Ann Patricia Skey, Public Affairs Issue Manager, IBM United Kingdom Limited.
- Alan Bernard Smith, Area Manager (Flood Defence), National Rivers Authority, Thames Region.
- Raymond Herbert Smith. For political and public service.
- Geoffrey Somers. For services to outdoor education and to Polar Exploration.
- Christopher Alexander Spence, Director, London Lighthouse.
- Daphne Sybil Kathleen Spink. For services to the community in South Cambridgeshire.
- Robert John Stapleford, Chief Superintendent, Nottinghamshire Constabulary.
- Judith Margaret Steel, Part-time Associate Specialist in Diabetes, Royal Infirmary, Edinburgh.
- Anthony Stevens, Director, Clarke Hall, Wakefield. For services to museum education.
- Muriel Stewart, Vice-President, Greater Manchester Branch, British Red Cross Society.
- Pamela Strachan, Education Officer, State Hospital, Carstairs.
- Dennis Edward Surgenor, Secretary, Scottish Egg Producer Retailers' Association.
- Rosemary Fleming Swallow. For services to the community in Hertford.
- Barbara Elizabeth Swan. For services to the community in Wester Hailes, Edinburgh.
- Philip Walter Syms, Director, Flight Refuelling Limited.
- Trevor John Tarring, Chairman, Metal Bulletin.
- Alan Spencer Taylor, Principal Timpanist, Royal Opera House Orchestra.
- Aubrey James Taylor, President and Welfare Officer, Stourbridge Branch, Royal Air Forces Association.
- Kate Agnes Thaxton, Director General, Eastern Electricity Consumers' Committee.
- Frederick George Tibble, BEM, Chairman, Essex, Barking, Havering, Newham and Redbridge, War Pensioners' Committee.
- Paul Tilsley. For political and public service.
- Sheila Mary Tipton. For services to the Housing Association Movement in Greater Manchester.
- Rose Tomlin, County Hospitals Organiser, Nottinghamshire Women's Royal Voluntary Service.
- Peter Totney, Regional Collector of Taxes, Board of Inland Revenue.
- Charles Christopher Gordon Trump, Farmer.
- Pamela Eileen Turner. For political service.
- Victor James Turton, Partner, Turton's Quality Foods.
- Raymond Brian Tutt, lately Cleansing and Contracts Officer, Eastbourne Borough Council.
- Robert Tweddle, Marketing Director, Smith Meters Limited. For services to Export.
- Audrey Tyler, Regional Genetic Fieldworker (Research), University of Wales, College of Medicine and National Health Service, Wales.
- Flight Lieutenant Rory Underwood, Royal Air Force. For services to Rugby Union Football.
- Roland Vernon. For services to the community in the West Midlands.
- David Ewing Wakeford, International Trade Manager, Imperial Chemical Industries plc.
- Alexander William Walker, lately Member, Tweeddale District Council.
- Doreen Walsh, Voluntary Associate, Hampshire and Isle of Wight Probation Service.
- Neil Walton, Chairman and Managing Director, Silleck Mouldings Limited.
- Adrian Douglas Ward. For services to the mentally handicapped in Scotland.
- Carol Brenda Ward, lately Higher Executive Officer, Central Office of Information.
- Martina Josephine Ward. For political service.
- Kathleen Mary Wardle, Revenue Typing Manager, Board of Inland Revenue.
- Kaye Rosina Warner, Head of Dangerous Goods Office, Civil Aviation Authority.
- Derek John Waters, Engineering Manager, Lovaux Limited.
- Derek Watmough, Director of Music, Beacon Community College, Crowborough.
- George Alexander Watt, Director of Training and Deputy Director General and Secretary, St Andrew's Ambulance Association.
- Jessica Mary Webb, Head, Boston High School, Lincolnshire.
- Elsie Weighill, Executive Officer, Department of Education and Science.
- Mary Susan Westwood, Organiser, Book Delivery Service, Bognor Regis Council.
- Christina Miriam Wheeler, Personnel Manager, European Service, Navy, Army and Air Force Institute (NAAFI).
- Audrey Margaret White, Revenue Executive, Board of Inland Revenue.
- Margaret White, Vice Chairman, Sense. For services to the deaf-blind.
- Joan Williams. For political service.
- Donald Williamson, Group Manager, Land Reclamation, Northumberland County Council.
- Isabel Wilson. For services to the public and to the community in Cumbria.
- William Walker Wood. For services to Bowls.
- Alice Rose Marie Woods, lately Higher Executive Officer, Office of Population Censuses and Surveys.
- Stephen Graham Wright, Director of the European Nursing Development Agency, Tameside.

=== Imperial Service Order (ISO) ===
- Colin Ashton, Grade 7, Lord Chancellor's Department.
- Frederick James Baynham, Grade 7, Board of Customs and Excise.
- Kenneth Brown, Grade 7, Board of Customs and Excise.
- Thomas William Hill Brown, Grade 6, Department of the Environment, Northern Ireland.
- Arthur John Comstock, Grade 7, Ministry of Defence.
- Ivor Harris, Inspector of Taxes S P, Board of Inland Revenue.
- Kenneth George Harris, Grade 7, Ministry of Defence.
- Frederick Ronald Hayhurst, Grade 6, Home Office.
- John George Keeling Hickman, TD, lately First Class Valuer, Board of Inland Revenue.
- John David Hollands, lately Principal Agricultural Inspector, Health and Safety Executive..
- Donald William Jenkins, Grade 7, Property Service Agency Services.
- Julia Beryl Johnson, Grade 7, National Physical Laboratory, Department of Trade and Industry.
- Derek Charles Kinrade, Grade 7, Office of Fair Trading.
- Glyn Lewis, Principal Collector of Taxes, Board of Inland Revenue.
- Bernard William James Lynch, Grade 7, Department of Transport.
- Francis Ernley Mauger, lately Grade 7, Ministry of Defence.
- Margaret Anne Paul, Inspector of Taxes S P, Board of Inland Revenue.
- Charles William Phin, lately Grade 6, Ministry of Defence.
- Terence Arthur Russell, Grade 7, Office of Population Censuses and Surveys.
- Ronald James Shanks, Grade 6, Board of Inland Revenue.
- John Frederick Stevenson, Inspector of Taxes (P), Board of Inland Revenue.
- Ian Malcolm Tring, Grade 6, ADAS Food, Farming, Land and Leisure.
- Robin Burnell Wilson, Grade 7, Department of the Environment.
- Michael James Wittekind, lately Grade 7, Department of Social Security.
- Brian John Young, lately Regional Sheriff Clerk, Tayside, Central and Fife.

=== British Empire Medal (Military Division) ===
Royal Navy

- Petty Officer Airman (PHOT) Stuart Antrobus, D163299K.
- Chief Petty Officer Stores Accountant Brian James Austin, D081740Y.
- Chief Petty Officer (Operations) (Missile) Ronald Victor Belcher, D070269X.
- Local Colour Sergeant Joseph Cassidy, Royal Marines, P017266L.
- Chief Radio Supervisor Mervyn John Congdon, D086580E.
- Chief Petty Officer Weapon Engineering Artificer Michael George Dennis, Dl16582P.
- Chief Petty Officer Airman (AH) Peter Alan Dobson, D088339R.
- Charge Chief Weapon Engineering Artificer David John Evans, D188433J.
- Chief Petty Officer (Operations) (Sonar) (SM) Bryan Stuart Head, J944020T.
- Chief Petty Officer Air Engineering Artificer (W) Reginald George Jobling, F984182Q.
- Chief Petty Officer Airman (AH) David Charles McPherson, D110486T.
- Charge Chief Communications Technician (Linguist) Jonathan Charles Mills, D159634U.
- Charge Chief Communications Technician (Linguist) Michael Peter Pearce, D161923F.
- Chief Petty Officer (Mine Warfare) Reginald John Charles Routley, Royal Naval Reserve, D985616A.
- Chief Petty Officer Weapon Engineering Artificer David Edmund Setterfield, D121643C.
- Chief Marine Engineering Mechanic (M) Albert Andrew Smith, Royal Naval Reserve, D985621L.
- Chief Petty Officer Air Engineering Artificer (L) John William Stewart Thompson, F956640H.

Army

- 24270212 Staff Sergeant (now Warrant Officer Class 2) Jeffrey Alan Baldock, Corps of Royal Engineers.
- 23945573 Staff Sergeant Maurice Bedding, The Royal Anglian Regiment, Territorial Army.
- 24288086 Sergeant Charles John Bleasdale, Corps of Royal Engineers.
- W0465393 Staff Sergeant Zoe Lilian Bloomfield, Royal Corps of Signals.
- 24349962 Staff Sergeant Clive Gregory Boocock, Corps of Royal Engineers, Territorial Army.
- 24423056 Staff Sergeant James Alfred Burgess, The King's Own Royal Border Regiment, Territorial Army.
- 24600702 Staff Sergeant Andrew Carver, Royal Army Pay Corps.
- 24395304 Staff Sergeant Derek William Stewart Chisholm, Royal Army Ordnance Corps.
- 24349336 Staff Sergeant (now Warrant Officer Class 2) Richard Anthony Clarkson, Corps of Royal Engineers.
- 24175196 Staff Sergeant Archibald Anthony Hannah Cochrane, Royal Pioneer Corps.
- 24586396 Sergeant James O'Hara Connelly, Intelligence Corps.
- 24072191 Staff Sergeant (Acting Warrant Officer Class 2) David Crookes, The Queen's Own Yeomanry, Territorial Army.
- 24438321 Staff Sergeant (Acting Warrant Officer Class 2) Joseph Darroch, The Gordon Highlanders.
- 24179481 Sergeant Keith Noel Davies, Corps of Royal Engineers.
- 23229973 Staff Sergeant William Henry Davies, Royal Corps of Transport, Territorial Army.
- 24529685 Corporal (Acting Sergeant) Michael Francis Dixon, Corps of Royal Engineers.
- 24654474 Staff Sergeant Michael William Dixon, Royal Corps of Transport, Territorial Army.
- WO459949 Staff Sergeant Kathleen Ann Fenlon, Women's Royal Army Corps.
- 24180071 Sergeant (Acting Staff Sergeant) Paul Anthony Flaherty, The Parachute Regiment.
- 24730701 Staff Sergeant Gavin Charles Fletcher, Intelligence Corps, Territorial Army.
- 23651403 Staff Sergeant Winston Douglas Geddis, The Royal Irish Rangers (27th (Inniskilling) 83rd & 87th), Territorial Army.
- 24281153 Sergeant George Glenton, Royal Army Ordnance Corps.
- 24190251 Sergeant Robin Gray, Corps of Royal Electrical and Mechanical Engineers.
- 24536383 Sergeant Jeffrey Mark Hannah, Corps of Royal Electrical and Mechanical Engineers.
- 24364197 Staff Sergeant (now Warrant Officer Class 2) Jonathan Charles David Harradine, Royal Corps of Signals.
- 24444593 Staff Sergeant Michael Wells Harrison, Corps of Royal Engineers.
- 24242236 Corporal Stanley James Harvey, Royal Corps of Signals.
- 24451461 Sergeant Carl David Hodson, Royal Army Ordnance Corps.
- 24140766 Staff Sergeant William Anthony Johnson, Irish Guards.
- 24173605 Corporal David William Joseph, The Royal Regiment of Wales (24th/41st Foot).
- 24473483 Staff Sergeant Paul Michael Ladd, Grenadier Guards.
- 24344820 Sergeant David Alan Langridge, Royal Corps of Signals.
- 24352533 Lance Bombardier John Leadbetter, Royal Regiment of Artillery.
- 24479813 Staff Sergeant Frank Liggins, Royal Army Medical Corps.
- 24144525 Staff Sergeant David George Mainprize, 16th/5th The Queen's Royal Lancers.
- 24430649 Staff Sergeant (now Warrant Officer Class 2) Zbigniew Andrzej Majchrzak, Corps of Royal Military Police.
- 24240295 Corporal Paul James Martin, Corps of Royal Engineers.
- 24232836 Staff Sergeant (Acting Warrant Officer Class 2) David Thomas Maxwell, The Parachute Regiment.
- 24395073 Staff Sergeant Joseph Peter McDonough, Royal Army Ordnance Corps.
- 24385461 Sergeant (Acting Staff Sergeant) Joseph Hans Mohamed McLaughlan, The Queen's Regiment.
- 24385297 Sergeant Isaac Porter Patterson McQuade, The Argyll and Sutherland Highlanders (Princess Louise's).
- 24328079 Sergeant James Alan McQuoid, Corps of Royal Engineers.
- 24555791 Sergeant (Acting Staff Sergeant) Kenneth Moore, The King's Own Royal Border Regiment.
- 24242022 Staff Sergeant Gerald Hugh Myatt, Royal Regiment of Artillery.
- 24282666 Staff Sergeant Lance Owens, Royal Army Ordnance Corps.
- 24362775 Staff Sergeant Malcolm David Pears, Corps of Royal Engineers.
- 24253977 Sergeant (Acting Staff Sergeant) Eric Pearson, The Green Howards (Alexandra Princess of Wales's Own Yorkshire Regiment).
- 24299993 Staff Sergeant Philip Peet, Royal Corps of Signals.
- 21162252 Sergeant (Acting Staff Sergeant) Padambahadur Rai, 10th Princess Mary's Own Gurkha Rifles.
- 24224560 Sergeant Paul Scarfe, Royal Regiment of Artillery.
- 24292980 Sergeant Robert Whyte Scott, 14th/20th King's Hussars.
- 24142877 Staff Sergeant (Acting Warrant Officer Class 2) Geoffrey Smith, Royal Corps of Transport.
- 24260410 Staff Sergeant Albert Spence, Yorkshire Volunteers, Territorial Army.
- 22149218 Staff Sergeant Frank Gordon Terence Spiers, Royal Army Pay Corps, Territorial Army.
- 21167953 Rifleman (Acting Lance Corporal) Toybahadur Thapa, 2nd King Edward VIIIs Own Gurkha Rifles.
- 24127576 Sergeant Derrick Thomas Thurley, Royal Corps of Signals.
- 24437827 Staff Sergeant (now Warrant Officer Class 2) Timothy Roy Trafford, Corps of Royal Military Police.
- .24551331 Staff Sergeant (now Warrant Officer Class 2) Terence Clive Tregaskes, Army Air Corps.
- 24327172 Bombardier John Shaw Tyrie, Royal Regiment of Artillery.
- 24294841 Staff Sergeant Francis Vaughan, Royal Corps of Signals.
- 24362871 Sergeant Simon Paul Wagstaff, Corps of Royal Engineers.
- 24125250 Lance Sergeant Graham Warner, Grenadier Guards.
- 24522088 Staff Sergeant Bernard Robert Watson, Corps of Royal Military Police.
- WO473030 Sergeant Alison Margaret Winckles, Women's Royal Army Corps.
- 24248902 Sergeant Stephen Wright Wolff, Scots Guards.

Royal Air Force

- T8090097 Chief Technician Stewart Gerard Dodd.
- W1948406 Chief Technician Keith Dyson.
- Q8092679 Flight Sergeant Thomas Dougald Farrell.
- T8055602 Sergeant Angela Agnes Rodger Fitzgerald, Women's Royal Air Force.
- El960020 Flight Sergeant Peter Charles Gilbert.
- El960091 Flight Sergeant John David Graham, (Retired).
- B8114422 Sergeant Robert Hamilton.
- G8116195 Sergeant Kevin Nigel Hardy.
- R8178454 Corporal Brian Edward Irvine.
- G8019906 Sergeant Shaun Marc Kay.
- K8055962 Sergeant Wendy Isabelle Lockey, Women's Royal Air Force.
- P8073143 Flight Sergeant Thomas McCune.
- M4255094 Flight Sergeant Douglas Sandeman McKelvie.
- H8001901 Sergeant David Norman Mayes.
- B2615810 Flight Sergeant Mollie Althea Morgan, Women's Royal Auxiliary Air Force.
- P4267427 Flight Sergeant Richard Charles Mountstephen.
- H8001381 Flight Sergeant John O'Rourke.
- R8108672 Flight Sergeant Michael Ronald Ricketts.
- P8067598 Flight Sergeant Wayne Albert George Sadler.
- E8080993 Flight Sergeant Kenneth Smith, Raf Regiment (Retired).
- K1944268 Chief Technician Peter Stevens.
- D8170982 Corporal Glyn Nicholas Taylor.
- F8011307 Chief Technician Stuart White.

=== British Empire Medal (Civil Division) ===
- Brian David Arbon, Head Gardener, Clare College, University of Cambridge.
- Henry Edward Ascott, Administrative Officer, Metropolitan Police.
- Cecil Bailes, Storeman, H.M. Prison, Leeds.
- Harry Arthur Ballington, Senior Hydrometric Technician, National Rivers Authority.
- Keith Barrett-Bee. For services to the community in Alderley Edge, Cheshire.
- June Patricia Batcheler, Senior Administrative Officer, London Borough of Islington Careers Service.
- Lilian Bates, Local Officer II, Department of Social Security.
- Allan Bell. For services to Rugby Union.
- Douglas Roper Beresford, Project Manager, IMI plc.
- Alan Arthur Bidewell, Fitter, Metropolitan Police.
- Kathleen Louise Bizzell, Administrative Officer, Department of Trade and Industry.
- Joan Florence Blanchard, Senior Departmental Secretary, Vosper Thorneycroft (UK) Ltd.
- Hazel Harriet Bowes, Receptionist and Telephonist, Yorkshire Electricity Group plc.
- James Samuel John Bowling, Principal Keeper, North Foreland Lighthouse, Trinity House.
- Isobel Graham Bowmaker, Administrative Officer, Scottish Office.
- Ronald Sidney Boxall, Chargehand Tree Feller and Pruner, Hampton Court Palace Gardens, Department of the Environment.
- Kenneth Thomas Braid, lately Senior Driver, Milton Keynes Development Corporation.
- John Briggs, Coal and Ash Engineer, Thorpe Marsh Power Station, National Power plc.
- John Wilson Brown. For services to the community in Oldham, Lancashire.
- Kenneth Wood Bryar, Volunteer Observer, Meteorological Office.
- Peter Butcher. For services to the Dronfield Ambulance Cadet Division, St. John Ambulance Brigade.
- Geoffrey Butler, Chargehand Carver, York Minster.
- Alan Campbell, Production and Development Test Technician, British Aerospace Defence Ltd.
- Henry Campbell, Paperkeeper, Public Record Office, Department of the Environment, Northern Ireland Civil Service.
- Patrick John Carthy, Instructional Officer Grade II (Swimming), Ministry of Defence.
- John Campbell Carty, Labourer, Water Department, Strathclyde Regional Council.
- Patrick Raymond Casey, Production Supervisor, Swan Hunter Shipbuilders Ltd.
- William Gordon Churchill, Process and General Supervisory Grade D, Ministry of Defence.
- Nora Claridge. For services to the community in Cambridge.
- Alan Clarke, Station Commander Retained, Lancashire Fire Brigade.
- David William Clarke, Sub Officer Retained, Oxfordshire Fire Service.
- Richard James Clarke, Chief Warder (Support Manager1), British Museum.
- Joan Eileen Cliff, Administrative Officer, Ministry of Defence.
- Rosemary Jean Coker. For services to the Dental Practice Board, Eastbourne, Sussex.
- John Connell, lately Coxswain, Amble Lifeboat, Royal National Lifeboat Institution.
- James Connelly, Gardener, St. Helen's Borough Council, Merseyside.
- Olive Elizabeth Connolly, Senior Travel Information Assistant, London Transport.
- Thomas Robert Cook, Meter Repairs Supervisor, North West Water plc.
- Edna Florence Corbitt, Foreign and Commonwealth Office.
- Samuel John Courtney, Auxiliary Constable, Royal Ulster Constabulary.
- Constance Sylvia Creighton. For services to the Southport and District Spastic Society.
- Mary Winifred Diana Cresswell. For voluntary fundraising, services for the World Wide Fund for Nature.
- Margaret Dagleish Currie. For services to the community in Fairlie, Ayrshire.
- James Cusack. For services to the Buckinghamshire Army Cadet Force.
- Louise Da-Cocodia. For services to the West Indians' Organisation's Co-ordinating Committee.
- Graham Arthur Dance, Brigade Photographer, Gloucestershire Fire and Rescue Service.
- David Owen Davies. For services to the North West East, War Pensions Committee.
- David Thomas Davies, Signalman, Regional Railways, British Railways.
- Gwyneth Mary Davies. For services to the Swansea and District Branch of the Multiple Sclerosis Society.
- Alexander Thain Dempster. Lately Foreman of Works, English Heritage, Berwick-upon-Tweed and For services to conservation of the Built Heritage.
- James Eugene Devlin, Shift Foreman, British Nuclear Fuels plc.
- Bernard Ernest Dickerson, Constable, Ministry of Defence Police.
- James Howard Dickson, Process and General Supervisory Grade E, Ministry of Defence.
- Patrick Joseph Donaghy, Sergeant, Royal Ulster Constabulary.
- Robert Charles Dawson Douglas, Coxswain, North Sunderland Lifeboat, Royal National Lifeboat Institution.
- Terry Dunbar. For services to the Newcastle Society for the Mentally Handicapped Action for Community Employment Scheme.
- Sheila Jessie Thomson Duncan. For services to the Lamb's House Day Centre for the elderly in Edinburgh.
- William Alexander Edgar. For services to the St. John Ambulance Brigade.
- George Elliott, Principal Officer, H.M. Prison, Manchester.
- William Embery, Electrician, British Aerospace Defence Ltd.
- Trevor Raymond England, Coxswain, Padstow Lifeboat, Royal National Lifeboat Institution.
- Joan Charlotte Evans, Branch Manager, Marlborough, The Post Office and For services to the community in Marlborough, Wiltshire.
- Brian James Fairhurst. For services to young people in St. Helens, Merseyside.
- Ernest Reginald Farey, Security and Safety Manager, UML Ltd.
- Harry Fleet, Sergeant, Police.
- William John Fort, Constable, North Yorkshire Police.
- Phyllis May France, Print Chargehand, Castleham Industries Sheltered Workshop, Hastings.
- Alfred Gallagher, Boatswain-in-Command, Royal Maritime Auxiliary Service, Ministry of Defence.
- Agnes Stanners Gardner, Senior Instructress, Special Education Needs, Fife.
- Ronald Abraham Garratt, Deputy Grade 1, Creswell Colliery, British Coal.
- Tom Frederick Gillott, Motorway Superintendent, Northamptonshire County Council.
- James William Givens, Head Warden, Northumberland National Park.
- Hugh James Edward Goodair, Head Usher, Royal Courts of Justice, Lord Chancellor's Department.
- Jack Gormley, Safety Engineer, Somerset County Council.
- Cherie Margaret Grace, Foreign and Commonwealth Office.
- Jean Graham, Canteen Manageress, Boots Pharmaceuticals.
- Jill Deborah Grant, Administrative Officer, Ministry of Defence.
- Mavis Jean Green, Accounts Clerk, Tarmac Roadstone Ltd and For services to the community in Freehay, Stoke-on-Trent.
- Robert Alan Griffiths, Assistant Manager Commercial Contracts, Cammell Laird Shipbuilders Ltd.
- Maurice St. Germier Gross. For services to Lawn Tennis.
- Nancy Halliday. For voluntary services to the Trostan Avenue Old People's Club, Ballymena.
- Dorothy Lilian Hargreaves, Administrative Assistant, Department of Health.
- Sylvia Christine Harte, Process Manager, Lincolnshire Police.
- Eleanor Francis Mary Adele Heagren-Gibbs, Organist and Choirmaster, St. Mary's Church, Little Wymondley and For services to the community in Hertfordshire.
- David Hardie Henderson, Head Janitor, Queen Margaret College, Edinburgh.
- Isobel Robson Melrose Herbert. For services to the community in Yetholm, Roxburghshire.
- Marion Lucy Heywood. For services to the elderly in Lancashire and the Cullen Grange Home for the Aged, Bootle.
- Thomas James Richard Hickman, Association Quartermaster, Territorial, Auxiliary and Volunteer Reserve Association.
- Leonard Sylvester Hillier, Leading Patrolman, Ministry of Defence.
- Kenneth Christopher Hills. For services to road safety in South East London.
- Glenn James Hindson, Train Crew Supervisor, London Midland Region, British Railways.
- Cornelius Sydney Hiscocks, Assistant Manager, Shelwork Industries Sheltered Workshop, Salisbury.
- Ernest Hodges, Senior Macebearer, Lord Mayor of Westminster.
- Brian Hogan, Health Physics Monitor, Scottish Nuclear Ltd.
- Roy Ingram Hole. For services to the Berkshire, Buckinghamshire and Oxfordshire Big Band.
- Hilda Winifred Holloway, Administrative Assistant, Ministry of Defence.
- Andrew Murray Holmes, Associate Manufacturing Engineer, IBM United Kingdom Ltd. and for services to the deaf.
- Charles William Holt, Force Police Bandmaster, Cheshire Constabulary.
- Dorothy Honeyman. For services to the community in Yarm, Cleveland.
- John Charles Hopegood, Legal Assistant, South Western British Gas plc.
- Ronald George Hopkins. Lately Operations Manager, Mid-Sussex Water Company.
- Julia Marianne Horgan, Personal Secretary, Ministry of Defence.
- Robert Frederick Horrell. For charitable services to the community in Peterborough.
- Patrick John Horton, Road Sweeper, East Staffordshire District Council.
- Ronald Henry Howe, lately Support Grade Band 2 (Messenger), Central Office of Information.
- June Mary Hudson, Support Grade Band 1, Office of the Minister for the Civil Service.
- Kenneth Roland Hughes. For services to the Kelsborrow Choir and Westminster Singers, Chester.
- James Ingoldsby. For services to the community in Berwickshire.
- Elspeth Irvine, Rehabilitation Worker for the Blind, North Down and Ards Unit of Management, Co. Down.
- Maureen Dorothy June Jackson. For services to Meals-on-Wheels, Daventry Women's Royal Voluntary Service.
- Morfydd Eileen James. For services to the local community in Llanelli, Dyfed.
- Ben Jessop. For services to Cricket in Yorkshire.
- Barrie Thomas Arthur Johnson, Supervisor, National Rivers Authority.
- Clara Wingate Johnson, Administrative Officer, Crown Office and Procurator Fiscal Service, Scottish Office.
- John Frederick Joiner. For services to the Royal Tunbridge Wells Carnival Committee.
- Mair Elin Jones. For services to the community in Llandudno, Gwynedd.
- William Gerrard Joy, Constable, Leicestershire Constabulary and for charitable services to the community in Hinckley.
- Betty Kellie, Revenue Assistant, Inland Revenue.
- Brian Edward Kendrick, Craft Electrician, Midlands Electricity plc.
- Evelyn Kennedy, Revenue Personal Secretary, Inland Revenue.
- William John Kennedy, Sergeant, Royal Ulster Constabulary.
- Christina Mathieson Knight. For services to the St. John Ambulance Brigade and to Sport.
- Nellie Marie Korf, Organist, Ongar United Reformed Church and For services to the community in Ongar, Essex.
- Charles Edwin Lacy, Industrial Foreman and Technical Works Supervisor, Property Service Agency Services, Department of the Environment.
- Richard Ninnies Lander, lately H.M. Coastguard, St. Ives, Cornwall.
- George Edward Lawrie, Auxiliary Coastguard-in-Charge, Mallaig.
- Betty Irene Laws, Secretary, Kingston upon Thames Sea Cadet Corp.
- Irene Lawson (Mrs. Edith Irene Sindall). For services to the Reldene School of Dancing, Withernsea, North Humberside and for charitable services.
- Edith May Laycock, General Manageress, W. W. Laycock and Sons Ltd.
- Fred Lloyd. For services to the community in Royton, Oldham, Lancashire.
- Derek William John Longhurst, Sector Officer, H.M. Coastguard, Portrush, Department of Transport.
- Peter Llewellyn Lovett, Stores Manager, Westland Helicopters Ltd.
- William James Lunn. For voluntary physiotherapist services to the Armed Forces.
- Angus John MacColl. For services to the community in Isle of Mull.
- Donald Mackenzie. For services to the community in Lochcarron.
- George Stephen Manson, Auxiliary Coastguard-in-Charge, Broughness.
- William Henry Mardon, Quality Leader (East), Regional Railways, British Railways.
- Frank Massey, Manager, Civil Engines, Rolls-Royce plc.
- Phyllis Mathews. For services to the blind and partially sighted in the Vale of Glamorgan.
- Ethel Annie McCarthy. For services to the Shropshire County, Royal British Legion.
- Albert Nicholson McCue. For services to the community in Cathcart, Glasgow.
- George Patrick McErlane, Fitter's Helper, Northern Ireland Railways.
- Robert McGoldrick, Dairyman, Mid Kelton Farm.
- David Girvan McKeown, lately Technical Manager, Northern Ireland Railways.
- Peter Lawson Christian McLaren, Police Constable, Sussex Police and For services to young people in West Sussex.
- Christine Lindsay McLeod, Cutter, Pringle of Scotland Ltd.
- Rose Mary Clare McVeigh, Telephonist, Department of Economic Development, Northern Ireland Civil Service.
- Lilian Grace Mellow, Typist, Ministry of Agriculture, Fisheries and Food.
- Raymond George Miles, Craftsman Grade 1, Machinist, Ministry of Defence.
- Francis Edward Milne, Constable, Royal Ulster Constabulary.
- Mitchell Monrose, Cleaner, Inner London Magistrates' Courts Service.
- Patricia Hilda Moore, Personal Assistant to the Director, Northern Ireland Trade Association Ltd.
- Ivor Morgan, School Caretaker, West Glamorgan County School.
- Rose Winifred Morris. For services to the Royal British Legion, Gwent.
- Eleanor Morrison, Silver Service Waitress, House of Commons.
- Ian Moulds, Assistant Purser, North Sea Ferries.
- Kirsten Mugford. For services to the Stroud Women's Royal Voluntary Service.
- Myfwany Closs Neill-Morrison. For services to the community in Minster, Kent.
- Dorothy Ivy Newton, Support Manager 3 (Office Keeper), Board of Customs and Excise.
- Patrick Thomas Nicholls, Building Manager, Polytechnic of Central London.
- Raymond Nicol, Construction Superintendent, Press Offshore Ltd.
- Doris Mabel Norris. For services to the community in Broughty Ferry, Dundee.
- David Gwyn O'Brien. For services to the community and to the Oystermouth Branch of Arthritis Care, Swansea.
- Jack Oddy, Poppy Appeal Organiser, The Royal British Legion.
- Lynda Margaret O'Donnell, Sergeant, Tayside Police.
- Margaret Josephine O'Donnell, Community. Relations Worker, Peace and Reconciliation Group, Londonderry.
- Mary Elizabeth O'Garro, Linen Room Superintendent, Great Ormond Street Hospital for Sick Children.
- Hannah Mary O'Mahony, Support Grade Band 2 (Messenger), Ministry of Defence.
- Susan Orr, Cleaner, Police Authority for Northern Ireland, Northern Ireland Civil Service.
- Joyce Mary Magdalene Padfield, Senior Supervisor, The London Fancy Box Company Ltd and For services to the community in Dover.
- David Milton Paley, Station Officer Retained, West Yorkshire Fire Brigade.
- Grace Palmer, Personal Secretary to the Clerk to the Solihull Justices.
- John Parker, Managing Director, European Gas Turbines.
- William Trevor Parry. For services to the Wrexham Care Association and the elderly community in Wales.
- David William Patterson, Postman, Durham Delivery Office, The Post Office and for charitable services to the community in Durham.
- Katherine Helen Pearce, Organist and Choirmaster, St. Swithin's Church, Yarmouth, Isle of Wight and For services to the community.
- Pamela Pease, Company Distribution Manager, Time and Data Systems International Ltd.
- Roger Alan Penniket, Constable, West Midlands Police and for charitable services to the community in the West Midlands.
- Eileen Margaret Petters, Personal Assistant, British Council.
- June Alice Pettifer. For nursing services to the mentally handicapped and elderly in St. Albans and lately Organiser, Peripatetic Day Care Centre, Hertfordshire County Council.
- Lilian Ivy Phelps, Administrative Officer, Board of Customs and Excise.
- Margaret Anne Place, Secretary to the Chief Probation Officer, West Yorkshire.
- Anthony Holbrook Price. For services to the Purton Branch, Age Concern, Wiltshire.
- Ida Mary Prins-Buttle. For services to Arthritis Care and to the community in Bath.
- Josephine Mary Randall. For services to the community in Brighton, East Sussex.
- Mary Veronica Reay, lately Administrative Assistant (Legal), Tyne and Wear Passenger Transport Executive.
- Cricket Genevieve Pearl Renwick. For services to the Torbay Women's Royal Voluntary Service.
- Edward James Reynolds, Sub Officer, Norfolk Fire Service.
- Mair Alwena Richards, Personal Secretary, Agricultural Development and Advisory Service, Welsh Office.
- Alan Marshall Roberts. For services to the hard of hearing in Bromley, Kent.
- Robert James Roberts, Services Technician, Wales British Gas plc and for services to the community in Porthcawl.
- Douglas Robinson, Administration Officer, Harrogate Sea Cadet Corps.
- John Barry Robinson, Sergeant, West Yorkshire Police and For services to the community in Bradford.
- Dorothy Joyce Roche. For services to the community in Market Drayton, Staffordshire.
- Gilbert Jones Roderick, Sub Officer Retained, West Glamorgan Fire Service.
- John Rogers. For services to the 108th Glasgow Boys' Brigade Company.
- John Rogers, Service Engineer, Wales British Gas plc and for services to the community in West Glamorgan.
- Ralph Woodfull Rogers, Volunteer Observer, Meteorological Office.
- Robert Warrington Rollisson. For services to the Fishing Industry and the Bridlington and Flamborough Fisheries Society.
- Moreen Rita Rolston. For services to the community in Ligoniel, Belfast.
- Charlotte May Rowley. For services to the community in Stoke-on-Trent, Staffordshire.
- Lady Nancy Margaret Ruddle. For services to the community in Rutland.
- Ronald Sabiston, Sector Officer, H.M. Coastguard, Redcar, Department of Transport.
- Shelia Ruth Sadler, Administrative Assistant, Department of Social Security.
- Dorothy Joan Schulz. For services to the Dorset Branch, British Red Cross Society.
- Robert John Scott, Caretaker and Groundsman, Armagh Observatory.
- William Reginald Scott, Laboratory Technician, Queen's University, Belfast.
- Kathleen Holmes Seaborne. For services to St. Andrew's United Reformed Church, Sheffield.
- Edward John Shand, Estate Foreman, Minsteracres Estate, Co Durham.
- Geoffrey Harold Sherborne, Farm Manager, Agricultural and Food Research Council.
- Helena Dolphus Shoy, Revenue Protection Inspector, London Underground Ltd.
- Elizabeth Barr Simpson, Personal Clerk to Northern Area Manager, Ulsterbus Ltd.
- Samuel John Simpson, Sergeant, Royal Ulster Constabulary.
- Terry Singh, Senior Dog Warden, City of Bradford Metropolitan Council.
- Gordon Herbert Skelton, Senior Storekeeper, Ministry of Defence.
- David Raymond Smith, Purchasing Officer, Norfolk County Council.
- Edward Albert Smith, Driver (Non Craft Band 8), Science and Engineering Research Council.
- Edward Leonard Smith, Service Engineer, Southern British Gas plc.
- Kathleen Smith. For services to the Research Equipment Fund, Royal Manchester Children's Hospital and For services to the community in Lancashire.
- Shelia Margaret Smith, lately Reprographics Operator, British Nuclear Fuels plc.
- Graham Snook, Senior Technical Officer, Avon County Council.
- Arthur Kenneth Boyd Sofield, Constable, Metropolitan Police.
- Claude Chapman Sonly. For services to Smallbore Shooting in Yorkshire and Humberside.
- Jean Margaret Souza-Okpofabri, Personal Secretary, Health and Safety Executive, Department of Employment.
- Jane Spencer. For services to the Stamford Foster Care Group, Lincolnshire County Council.
- Marjorie Gladys Stables. For services to the community and to the Bereavement Care Service, Cruse, in Reading.
- John Benjamin Stacey, Gardener, East Staffordshire District Council.
- Eric Stafford, Health Physics Monitor, British Nuclear Fuels plc.
- Gerald Thomas Stanley, Head Gardener, West Mercia Constabulary.
- Ronald Harold Stenning, lately Industrial Foreman, Building Management, Property Service Agency Services, Department of the Environment.
- Ernest Charles Hamilton Stephens. For services to the Llanidloes Branch, Royal Air Forces Association.
- Katharine Jeanne Stewart. For services to the community in Abriachan.
- Martin Frank Sykes. For services to the London South, War Pensions Committee.
- Joan Tabb, Support Manager 2, Ordnance Survey, Department of the Environment.
- Gordon Lawrence Talbot, Driller, Avionic Components Ltd.
- Joyce Irene Tarr, Administrative Officer, Department of Trade and Industry.
- Janet Winifred Taylor, lately Senior Personal Secretary, National Institute of Agricultural Botany.
- John Arthur Taylor, lately Craftsman and Joiner, Ministry of Defence.
- Norman Cecil Tebbutt, lately Senior Caretaker, Nerie College, Northampton.
- Robert Frederick Thacker, Health Physics Monitor, Dounreay United Kingdom Atomic Energy Authority.
- David Vaughan Thomas, Constable, Metropolitan Police.
- John Logan Thorburn, lately Principal Officer, H.M. Prison, Saughton, Edinburgh.
- Robert Luke Grant Thornton. For services to the National Star Centre for Disabled Youth, Cheltenham, Gloucestershire.
- Henry Thurston. For services to the Boys' Brigade in Liverpool.
- Isabella Mary Thwaytes, Tea Lady, British Ports Federation.
- Julia Christine Todd, Principal Officer, H.M. Prison, Holloway.
- Valerie Gladys Todd. For services to the Jersey Academy of Dancing.
- Cecil Charles Tonsley, Beekeeper.
- Norman Townsend, Farm Worker, Aston Hall Farm.
- Muriel Tracy. For services to the Royal National Lifeboat Institution and for charitable services to the community in Bath.
- Dorothy Trafford. For services to the Children's Talent Show, "Joytime", in Wallasey, Merseyside.
- Olive Tremble, Private Secretary, Northern British Gas plc and for charitable services to the community in Newcastle upon Tyne.
- Stanley Trimble. For services to the Fishing Industry.
- Robert Turner. For services to the community in Riding Mill, Northumberland.
- Denis George Turney. For services to Swimming in South East England.
- Dominic Valdez, Director, Dom Valdez Centre for Cancer Care, "Halton House", Runcorn and for charitable services to the community in Liverpool.
- Marjorie Amyand Vincent. For services to the Sussex Branch, British Red Cross Society.
- Philip Rodney Wakeman, Deputy Workshop Supervisor, Agricultural and Food Research Council.
- Olive Beatrice Wallace, Administrative Officer, Ministry of Agriculture, Fisheries and Food.
- Kenneth Andrew Warren. For voluntary services to the Accident and Emergency Department of the Derbyshire Royal Infirmary Hospital.
- Albert William Warwick, Senior Highways Officer, Humberside County Council.
- James Alexander Watt, Crane Operator, Ocean Benloyal, Atlantic Drilling Company Ltd.
- Seamus Dominic Weatherhead. For services to the Lame Credit Union Ltd.
- Patricia Rose White, Secretary to the Charles West School of Nursing, London.
- Jean Whiteley, Typist, Department of Social Security.
- Elizabeth Clark Anderson Whyte. For musical services to the community in Stonehaven, Kincardineshire.
- Jean Berry Whyte. For services to the Paisley Division, Soldiers', Sailors' and Airmen's Families Association.
- Colin Owen Wiggins, Detective Constable, Essex Police.
- Antony Peter Wigley, Senior Administrative Officer, Thames Valley Police.
- Charles Robert Williams, lately Civilian Instructor, No.2247 (Hawarden) Squadron, Air Training Corps.
- John Williams, Foreman, North Western Electricity Board plc and for services to the community in Stockport.
- Kenneth Gordon Williams, Support Manager 2, Ministry of Defence.
- Colin Reginald Wilson, Principal Technician, Acer Consultants.
- William Stuart Wilson, Administrative Officer, Board of Customs and Excise.
- Michael John Winterman, Engineering Assistant, Southern British Gas plc and for services to the Multiple Sclerosis Society.
- Hilary Wood, Catering Manageress, Nottingham Polytechnic.
- Nora Wood. For services to the community in Rotherham, South Yorkshire.
- June Madeleine Florence Woodward, Personal Secretary, Ministry of Defence.
- Marion Woolley, Administrative Officer, Ministry of Defence.
- Gladys Wormald. For services to the Airedale District Hospital and Bradford Women's Royal Voluntary Service.

=== Royal Red Cross ===
==== Member (RRC) ====
Army

- Colonel Janet Brown Gillies (476216), Queen Alexandra's Royal Army Nursing Corps.
- Lieutenant Colonel Beryl Melvin (477000), Queen Alexandra's Royal Army Nursing Corps, Territorial Army.

Royal Air Force

Wing Commander Alice Mary Orr, ARRC (0407992), Princess Mary's Royal Air Force Nursing Service (Retired).

==== Associate (ARRC) ====
Royal Navy

- Superintending Nursing Officer Jan Dulcie Beach, Queen Alexandra's Royal Naval Nursing Service.

Army

- Major Merrill Janna Doresa (509050), Queen Alexandra's Royal Army Nursing Corps.
- Major Pauline Jane Horton (508113), Queen Alexandra's Royal Army Nursing Corps.
- 24109424 Staff Sergeant (now Warrant Officer Class 2) David Jeffrey Thomas, Royal Army Medical Corps.

Royal Air Force

Flight Lieutenant Dympna Helen Ryan (0409274), Princess Mary's Royal Air Force Nursing Service.

=== Air Force Cross (AFC) ===
Royal Navy

- Lieutenant Commander Michael William Watson.

Royal Air Force

- Squadron Leader Jeremy Nicholas Fradgley (5204057).
- Squadron Leader Nicholas Simon Francis Gilchrist (8026769).
- Squadron Leader Thomas Joseph Perrem (8025313).

=== Queen's Police Medal (QPM) ===
England and Wales

- Raymond Charles Adams, Commander, Metropolitan Police.
- Kenneth William Harry Andrews, Detective Superintendent, Metropolitan Police.
- David John Baker, Chief Superintendent, West Midlands Police.
- Frederick Barry Bancroft, Deputy Chief Constable, Northumbrian Police.
- Anthony John Peter Butler, Deputy Chief Constable, Leicestershire Constabulary.
- Vernon Clegg, Inspector, West Yorkshire Police.
- David Yeomans Cooke, Commander, Metropolitan Police.
- John Mervyn Jones, Deputy Chief Constable, Cheshire Constabulary.
- Robert Paul Mee, Detective Constable, Nottinghamshire Constabulary.
- Roger Russell Menear, Chief Inspector, Metropolitan Police.
- Derek Charles Moss, Staff Officer to Director of Extended Interviews, Home Office.
- William Frederick Palmer, lately Assistant Chief Constable, British Transport Police.
- James Liddle Paterson, Assistant Chief Constable, Greater Manchester Police.
- William Robert Sergeant, Former Detective Chief Superintendent, Merseyside Police.
- Alan Alexander Smith, Detective Chief Superintendent, Norfolk Constabulary.
- David Sydney Voice, Chief Superintendent, Kent County Constabulary.
- Anthony Frederick Warren, Chief Superintendent, West Mercia Constabulary.
- Kenneth Robert Williams, Deputy Chief Constable, Durham Constabulary.

Northern Ireland

- Harold Colgan, Detective Superintendent, Royal Ulster Constabulary.
- Samuel Ross Penney, Inspector, Royal Ulster Constabulary.

Scotland

- Donald Ewen Cameron, Deputy Chief Constable, Grampian Police.
- Thomas Ian Dickie, Chief Superintendent, Strathclyde Police.

=== Queen's Fire Service Medal (QFSM) ===
England and Wales

- Bernard Paul Grimshaw, Assistant Chief Officer, West Midlands Fire Service.
- Peter Kneale, Assistant Chief Officer, West Yorkshire Fire Service.
- Kenneth John Knight, Deputy Chief Officer, Devon Fire Service.
- Edward George Pearn, Assistant Chief Officer, Hampshire Fire Brigade.
- Eric Alfred Priest, Deputy Chief Officer, Cleveland County Fire Brigade.
- David Robin Richards, Chief Officer, Hereford and Worcester Fire Brigade.
- Brian Gordon Robinson, Chief Officer, London Fire Brigade.

Scotland

- John White, Firemaster, Fife Fire and Rescue Service.

=== Queen's Commendation for Valuable Service in the Air ===
Army

- Lieutenant (now Captain) David Charles Senior (530477), Army Air Corps.

Royal Air Force

- Squadron Leader Walter Paul William Brown (5203356), (Retired).
- Flight Lieutenant Malcolm John Groombridge (5204523).
- Squadron Leader William Rayner Hartree (8026536).
- Squadron Leader David Stanley Jenkins (4243424).
- Squadron Leader Phillip James Mason (3522361).
- Squadron Leader Stuart Austin Weatherston (8026542), (Retired).
- Squadron Leader Jeremy Whittingham (8026510).
- Master Aircrew William Michael Williams (X0685477).

== Diplomatic Service and Overseas List ==
=== Order of Saint Michael and Saint George ===
==== Knight Grand Cross (GCMG) ====
- Sir Michael Alexander, KCMG, lately United Kingdom Permanent Representative on the North Atlantic Council, Brussels.

==== Knight Commander (KCMG) ====
- Nicholas Peter Bayne, CMG, British High Commissioner, Ottawa.
- John Dixon Ikle Boyd, CMG, Foreign and Commonwealth Office.
- Patrick Stanislaus Fairweather, CMG, H.M. Ambassador-designate, Rome.

==== Companion (CMG) ====
- Dennis Oldrieve Amy, OBE, H.M. Ambassador, Antananarivo.
- Michael Anthony Arthur, Foreign and Commonwealth Office.
- Gordon Stephen Barrass, Foreign and Commonwealth Office.
- Madelaine Glynne Dervel Evans, Foreign and Commonwealth Office.
- John Gerrard Flynn, H.M. Ambassador, Luanda.
- Julian Dana Nimmo Hartland-Swann, H.M. Ambassador, Rangoon.
- Simon Nicholas Peter Hemans, CVO, H.M. Ambassador, Kiev.
- Patrick David Henderson, lately Head of Economics and Statistics Department, OECD, Paris.
- Christopher Hulse, OBE, Foreign and Commonwealth Office.
- Michael Hastings Jay, Foreign and Commonwealth Office.
- Roderic Michael John Lyne, Foreign and Commonwealth Office.
- David Geoffrey Manning, Counsellor, H.M. Embassy, Moscow.
- Emyr Jones Parry, Foreign and Commonwealth Office.
- Peter Keegan Williams, H.M. Ambassador, Hanoi.

=== Order of the British Empire (Civil Division) ===
==== Knight Commander (KBE) ====
- Colin Henry Imray, CMG, British High Commissioner, Dhaka.
- Allan John Ramsay, CMG, lately H.M. Ambassador, Khartoum.

==== Commander (CBE) ====
- James Thomas Dominguez. For services to British commercial interests in Australia.
- Rita Fanhsu Lai-tai, OBE JP. For public services in Hong Kong.
- David Anthony Gledhill, JP. For services to commerce and the community in Hong Kong.
- Richard Thomas Ponsonby Hall, lately Assistant General Manager, Bank of International Settlements, Basle.
- Ian Francis Cluny MacPherson, OBE, Pro-Vice Chancellor, University of Science and Technology, Hong Kong.
- Donald Pragnell, LVO OBE, Counsellor (Management), H.M. Embassy, Tokyo.

==== Officer (OBE) ====
- Brian David Adams, First Secretary (Management), British High Commission, Dhaka.
- Charles Kerry Bagshaw, lately First Secretary, H.M. Embassy, Moscow.
- Adolfo Canepa. For public services in Gibraltar.
- George Denis Caravias. For services to British commercial interests in Greece.
- John Patrick Cushnan. For services to English education in Madrid.
- John David Depury. For welfare services to the community in the Sudan.
- Dr. John Rupert Harris. For medical welfare services to the community in Zaire.
- Ivor Noel Hume. For services to British cultural interests in Williamsburg, Virginia.
- John-Henry Kempster. For services to British commercial interests in Sri Lanka.
- Theresa Koroma, Director, British Council, Sierra Leone.
- Miriam Lau Kin-yee, JP. For public services in Hong Kong.
- Harry Bazett Legg, Speaker, Legislative Council, St. Helena.
- Dr. Edward Leong Che-Hung. For public services in Hong Kong.
- Laurence Leung Ming-yin, JP, Director of Immigration, Hong Kong.
- Frederic Samuel McCosh, QPM CPM JP, Commissioner of Correctional Services, Hong Kong.
- Professor William Alexander Miller. For services to education and community relations in the Sudan.
- Derek Moorhouse, First Secretary (Management), British High Commission, Canberra.
- Bryan Ralph Morris. For services to British interests in Gothenburg.
- Peter Sandiford, Director, British Council, Israel.
- Cecil Alfred John Sheppard, MBE QPM CPM, Deputy Commissioner of Police, Hong Kong.
- Christopher John Stephenson, Regional Controller, Commonwealth Development Corporation, India.
- Professor Tam Sheung-wai, JP, Pro-Vice Chancellor, Chinese University of Hong Kong.
- David John Theobald, Field Manager, British Council Primary Education Project, India.
- Clive Howard Woodland, First Secretary and Consul General, H.M. Embassy, Riyadh.

==== Member (MBE) ====
- George John Anthony Akras, Honorary British Consul, Aleppo.
- Elizabeth Maude Ayas. For services to English education in Adana, Turkey.
- Margaret Amy Bafende. For services to education and the community in Zaire.
- Edwina June Sewell-Baverstock, Assistant Information Officer, British Consulate-General, Los Angeles.
- Roger Bentley, Communications Officer, H.M. Embassy, Ankara.
- Jennifer Best, Senior Personal Assistant to the Governor of Hong Kong.
- Richard Francis Blandy, Honorary British Consul, Madeira.
- Peter Chan Fuk-sing. For services to the community in Hong Kong.
- Estelle Katharine Stewart Colliva. For services to the British community in Bologna.
- Eric John Crutchley. For services to commerce and the community in the Cayman Islands.
- George Khalil Dagher, Commercial Secretary, H.M. Embassy, Beirut.
- Hamish St. Clair Daniel, lately Second Secretary (Relief), H.M. Embassy, Khartoum.
- Mary Whitney De Castello, Information Officer, H.M. Embassy, Bogota.
- Cyril James Dopner. For services to radio engineering in Oman.
- Fiona Margaret Duby. For welfare services to the community in Bangladesh.
- John Dunn Naibun, JP, Chief Staff Officer, Auxiliary Medical Services, Hong Kong.
- The Reverend Father James Nathaniel Edwards. For services to the community in Montserrat.
- Leslie Thomas Elvin, lately Third Secretary (Management), H.M. Embassy, Khartoum.
- Janet Fletcher. For services to English education in Caracas.
- Pamela Ellen Flower. For services to the British community in Cannes.
- Norman John Gillanders, Registrar, University of Hong Kong.
- Margaret Rose Guercy, British Vice-Consul, Port-au-Prince, Haiti.
- Professor David William Gwilt, Chairman, Music Committee, Performing Arts Council, Hong Kong.
- Thomas Norbert Higgins. For services to the British community in Oporto.
- Jennifer Lynn Hobbs, Director, British Council, Zagreb.
- Robert Henry House, lately Second Secretary (Management), H.M. Embassy, Bucharest.
- Eugene Ramon Howes, Director of Postal Services, Gibraltar.
- Richard Edmund Jones. For services to British cultural interests in Greece.
- Dr. John Kirkwood Knowles. For medical and welfare services to the community in Malawi.
- Timothy Stephen Kooleshevich, Manager, Technical Works Section, H.M. Embassy, Washington.
- Lam Sui-fan, Senior Assistant Commissioner, Civil Aid Services, Hong Kong.
- Major Philemon Graham Marshall Lee. For services to the British community in Johore, Malaysia.
- Margaret Liwong Man-wan, Principal Nursing Officer, Department of Health, Hong Kong.
- Lo Chi-yuen, Assistant Director, Housing Department, Hong Kong.
- Sally Jean Marojica, Honorary British Consul, Dubrovnik.
- Roderick William Matheson, lately Honorary British Consul, Punta Arenas, Chile.
- Ronald Thomas Parr, lately Chief Security Officer, H.M. Embassy, Bucharest.
- Mary Patricia Phillips. For public and community service in Bermuda.
- Cyril Furnival Richards. For services to education in Czechoslovakia.
- The Reverend Arthur William Rider. For services to the British community in Cyprus.
- Sharon Audrey Rimmer, Personal Secretary, H.M. Embassy, Tel Aviv.
- Michael Thomas Shyrane, Communications Officer, U.K. Mission to the United Nations, New York.
- Pyara Singhsuri. For.services to the British community in Nakuru, Kenya.
- George Charles Meleady Strachan, Chief Investigator, ICAC, Hong Kong.
- Major Charles Edward Strafford. For services to ex-servicemen in France.
- Frederick Michael Frank Thorne, Third Secretary (Communications), H.M. Embassy, Tel Aviv.
- Brian Victor Voak. For services to engineering and the community in Pakistan.
- Edwin John Walters. For services to British commercial and community interests in Venezuela.
- Dr. Roger Stanley Windsor, For services to Veterinary Development in Peru.

=== Imperial Service Order (ISO) ===
- Colin Charles Greenfield, JP, Director of Information Technology Services, Hong Kong.
- Kwei See-kan, Director of Highways, Hong Kong.
- Anthony Robert Scott, Director of Corruption Prevention, Hong Kong.
- Barry Jonathan Clayton Woodroffe, Commissioner of Rating and Valuation, Hong Kong.

=== British Empire Medal (Civil Division) ===
- Alfred Busto, Divisional Officer, Fire Service, Gibraltar.
- Choy Chiu-ngan, Senior Confidential Assistant, Correctional Services Department, Hong Kong.
- Chung Woon-ming, Senior Transport Supervisor, Urban Services Department, Hong Kong.
- Betty Ruth Ebanks. For public and community services in the Cayman Islands.
- Fung Kai-chuen, Civil Administrator/ Despatch Clerk, Camp Commandant's Office, Hong Kong.
- Kwok Lai-lee, Deputy Branch Commander, Auxiliary Medical Service, Hong Kong.
- Lo Chuk-ming, Boatswain, Government Dockyard, Hong Kong.
- Ng Pui-lam, lately Civilian Clerk B, Army Department, Hong Kong.
- Poon Kwok-ching, lately Senior Overseer, Urban Services Department, Hong Kong.
- Stanley David Swain. For public and community services in Tristan da Cunha.
- Yin-ming Tam Chan, Senior Personal Secretary, Labour Department, Hong Kong.
- Harold Wong Ho-ching, Senior Clerical Officer, Prince of Wales Hospital, Hospital Services Department, Hong Kong.

=== Queen's Police Medal (QPM) ===
- John Brian Gould Smith, CPM, Assistant Commissioner, Royal Hong Kong Police Force.
- Lau To-Yee, CPM, Assistant Commissioner, Royal Hong Kong Police Force.

=== Colonial Police and Fire Service Medal (CPM) ===
- Denis Anthony Brookes, Chief Inspector, Royal Bermuda Police.
- Chin King-cheung, Principal Fireman, Hong Kong Fire Services.
- Tony Chiu Luk-kan, Superintendent, Royal Hong Kong Police Force.
- Chu Ping-wah, Senior Divisional Officer, Hong Kong Fire Services.
- Albert Kwok Cho-kuen, Senior Superintendent, Royal Hong Kong Police Force.
- Lai Kwok-leung, Chief Superintendent, Royal Hong Kong Police Force.
- Lam Kam-ling, Station Sergeant, Royal Hong Kong Police Force.
- Lee Hing-tsan, Principal Ambulanceman, Hong Kong Fire Services.
- Leung Shiu-kwan, Principal Fireman, Hong Kong Fire Services.
- Lichan Siu-mui, Woman Station Sergeant, Royal Hong Kong Police Force.
- Ma Chak-wa, Inspector, Royal Hong Kong Police Force.
- John Willard Moore, Commandant, Reserve Constabulary, Bermuda.
- Ng Wai-kit, Senior Superintendent, Royal Hong Kong Police Force.
- Pik Ying-keung, Senior Divisional Officer, Hong Kong Fire Services.
- Abdur Rahman, Chief Inspector, Royal Hong Kong Police Force.
- Jeffrey Alan Richards, Superintendent, Royal Hong Kong Police Force.
- John Barry Smith, Detective Chief Inspector, Royal Bermuda Police Force.
- Graeme McDonald Sutherland, Superintendent, Royal Hong Kong Police Force.
- Roy Taylor, Superintendent, Royal Hong Kong Police Force.
- Tse Chi-yuen, Station Sergeant, Royal Hong Kong Police Force.
- Clive Gordon Benn Walker, Superintendent, Royal Hong Kong Police Force.
- David Godfrey Weaver, Chief Inspector, Royal Hong Kong Police Force.
- Yau Wing-hong, Station Sergeant, Royal Hong Kong Police Force.

== Antigua and Barbuda ==
=== Order of Saint Michael and Saint George ===
==== Companion (CMG) ====
- James Alphaeus Emanuel Thomas. For public service.

== Belize ==
=== Order of the British Empire (Civil Division) ===
==== Member (MBE) ====
- Edmund Andrew Marshalleck. For public services.

== Cook Islands ==
=== Order of the British Empire (Civil Division) ===
==== Knight Commander (KBE) ====
- The Honourable Sir Geoffrey Arama Henry, Prime Minister of the Cook Islands.

== Grenada ==
=== Order of the British Empire (Civil Division) ===
==== Commander (CBE) ====
- Edward Roy Kent. For services to agriculture.

==== Officer (OBE) ====
- Shirley Robinson. For services to culture.

==== Member (MBE) ====
- John Benjamin. For services to art.

=== British Empire Medal (Civil Division) ===
- Veda Gemma Bruno. For services to sport.
- Merle Byer. For services to small business.
- Josephine Jacqueline Cornwall. For community services.
- Rupert Peters. For services to agriculture.

== Saint Christopher and Nevis ==
=== Order of the British Empire (Civil Division) ===
==== Member (MBE) ====
- Novalone Victorine Mallalieu. For services to the community.
- Christopher Elliot Desmond Walwyn. For public service.

== Saint Lucia ==
=== Order of the British Empire (Civil Division) ===
==== Dame Commander (DBE) ====
- Edna Leofrida, Lady Lewis. For community service.

==== Commander (CBE) ====
- Leton Felix Thomas, OBE. For public service in education.

==== Officer (OBE) ====
- Peter Anthony Bergasse, MBE. For public service in tourism.
- His Grace Archbishop Kelvin Edward Felix, DD. For public service in religion and education.

==== Member (MBE) ====
- Christopher Cornelius Alcindor. For public service in agriculture.
- Josephine Euriza Serieux. For community service.
- Sheila Myrna Wilson. For public service in nursing.

== Saint Vincent and the Grenadines ==
=== Order of the British Empire (Civil Division) ===
==== Officer (OBE) ====
- Dr. Harold St. Clair Rampersaud. For services to health.
- Henry Alphaeus Robertson. For services to education.

== Solomon Islands ==
=== Order of the British Empire (Civil Division) ===
==== Member (MBE) ====
- Bartholomew Selea Bara Buchanan. For public service.
- Gordon Geseni. For services to justice and commerce.

=== British Empire Medal (Civil Division) ===
- Joseph Maekeli. For public service.
- Agnes Neve. For services to nursing.
