= Eversley (name) =

Eversley is a surname and a masculine given name. It is an English name derived from various villages in Wiltshire, Yorkshire and Hampshire. Its meaning, boar's wood, originates from the Old English words eofor meaning a boar, and leah which refers to an enclosure in a forest used for agriculture. Notable people with the name include:

== Surname ==
- Chris Eversley (born 1991), American basketball player
- Fred Eversley (1941–2015), American sculptor
- John Eversley, British businessman
- Kurt Eversley (born 1970), Guyanese-born cricketer
- Marc Eversley (born 1969), Canadian basketball player and executive
- Ryan Eversley (born 1983), American auto racing driver

== Given name ==
- Eversley Linley (born 1969), Saint Vincent and the Grenadines athlete
- Eversley Mansfield (1887–1954), British football player
