= Eversley (disambiguation) =

Eversley may refer to:

- Eversley, a village in Hampshire, England
- Eversley (name), list of people with the surname or given name
- Eversley, Ontario, Canada, a small community in the township of King
- Eversley, a locality east of Ararat, Victoria
