= Peter Clarke (courtier) =

British Army officer and courtier

Major Sir Peter Cecil Clarke, KCVO (1927–2006) was a British Army officer and courtier.

Clarke served in the Army from 1945 to 1964; for the last three years, he was seconded as assistant private secretary to Princess Marina, Duchess of Kent. Between 1964 and 1968, he served as comptroller of her household; he also served as comptroller to Princess Alexandra from 1964 to 1969. He was then Chief Clerk to the Duchy of Lancaster from 1969 to 1992. He was appointed a Knight Commander of the Royal Victorian Order in the 1992 Birthday Honours, having earlier been appointed a Member Fourth-Class (in 1964) and a Commander (in 1969).
