= Geoffrey Chipperfield =

British civil servant (1933–2024)

Sir Geoffrey Chipperfield KCB
- Born: Geoffrey Howes Chipperfield; 20 April 1933
- Died: 30 January 2024 (aged 90)
- Education: New College, Oxford
- Occupation: Civil servant

Sir Geoffrey Howes Chipperfield KCB (20 April 1933 – 30 January 2024) was a British civil servant.

== Life and career ==
Born in 1933, Chipperfield attended New College, Oxford. He was called to the bar at Gray's Inn in 1955. The following year, he entered HM Civil Service as an official in the Ministry of Housing and Local Government. From 1970 to 1973, he was secretary to the Greater London Development Plan Inquiry. He then moved to the Department of the Environment, where was a deputy secretary from 1982. He was appointed Companion of the Order of the Bath (CB) in the 1985 Birthday Honours. In 1987, he was appointed a deputy secretary in the Department of Energy; he was appointed the department's Permanent Secretary in 1989. In 1991, he was appointed Permanent Secretary and Chief Executive of the Property Services Agency in succession to Patrick Brown. He served until 1993. He was appointed Knight Commander of the Order of the Bath (KCB) in the 1992 Birthday Honours.

After leaving the civil service, he was commissioned by the government to carry out an assessment of the Royal Fine Art Commission and delivered his report in 1996. He worked as a director of South West Water (later Pennon Group), serving as its Deputy Chairman from 2000 to 2003. He was also the Pro-Chancellor of the University of Kent from 1999 to 2005; in 2018, the university honoured him by renaming its business school building the Chipperfield Building.

Chipperfield died after a long illness on 30 January 2024, at the age of 90.
