= Pamela Gilbert =

Entomological librarian and writer (1932–2015)

- Born: 14 December 1932; Queen Charlotte's and Chelsea Hospital
- Died: 8 December 2015; Redhill
- Occupation: Librarian
- Employer: Natural History Museum
- Awards: Officer of the Order of the British Empire (1992 Birthday Honours)

Pamela Gilbert (14 December 1932 — 8 December 2015) was an English entomological librarian and writer. She is known for her work A Compendium of the Biographical Literature on Deceased Entomologists and for editing bibliographies of lepidoptera publications covering the Palaearctic.

== Early life ==
Pamela Gilbert was born on 14 December 1932 to Ellen Isabella (née Clark) and Albert Edward Gilbert at Queen Charlotte's Maternity Hospital, London. Her mother worked as a cook/ housekeeper and her father drove a taxi. During World War II, Gilbert was evacuated from the family home in Ladbroke Grove, London to Nailsworth, Gloucestershire. After the war, by which time the family had moved to Bounds Green, she finished secondary education at Trinity County Grammar School, gaining several School Certificate qualifications, including a distinction in biology and a higher level in botany.

== Career ==
Gilbert was appointed an "Assistant (Scientific)" at the then British Museum (Natural History), later the Natural History Museum, on 1 October 1951, and remained there for her entire career.

She was assigned to the Diptera Section in 1954, but did not find it to her liking. In 1956, at her own request, she transferred to the museum's entomology library. She effectively managed and physically carried out the library's relocation within the building, entailing the doubling of its capacity in 1972. She succeeded Bernard Clifton as Entomology Librarian in 1974, on his retirement, and became deputy head of the museum's merged Department of Library Services in 1991, having the grade of Principal Scientific Officer. She retired from the museum on 13 December 1992, but visited regularly to research her publications.

Early in her career, she undertook librarianship studies at North Western Polytechnic (now part of London Metropolitan University), and took the First Professional Examination of the Library Association (now Chartered Institute of Library and Information Professionals), but did not become an associate, as that would have required full-time study.

She served as secretary to the Association of Special Libraries and Information Bureaux's Biological Group, and as a member of the Standing Conference of National and University Libraries (now the Society of College, National and University Libraries). She made professional visits to Singapore, Australia, and Japan.

Her first and best-known book, A Compendium of the Biographical Literature on Deceased Entomologists, was published by the museum on 4 January 1978, although it carried a 1977 imprint. Her sequel to it, A Source Book for Biographical Literature on Entomologists, was published in 2007. It lists over 8000 entomologists, and gives 21,500 citations.

She also contributed to thirteen annual editions (under changing titles), and edited eleven, of "Bibliography of Palaearctic Lepidoptera" for the Society for European Lepidopterology (SEL). Together, these amount to 792 pages, citing around 10,000 references. Gilbert was made an honorary member of SEL, of which she was a founding council member, in 1988.

She wrote entries for the Oxford Dictionary of National Biography on Edward Donovan, Eleanor Glanville and William Elford Leach.

She was appointed an Officer of the Order of the British Empire (OBE) in the 1992 Birthday Honours.

== Death ==
Gilbert died, aged 82, on 8 December 2015 at Redhill, Surrey. The following May, an obituary with a bibliography was published in Nota Lepidopterologica, the SEL's journal.

Following her death, the contents of her library were sold online.

== Selected works ==
- A Compendium of the Biographical Literature on Deceased Entomologists. London: British Museum (Natural History). 1978. p. 455.
- with Hamilton, C.J. (1983). Entomology: A Guide to Information Sources. London: Mansell Publishing. pp. viii + 237.
- A Catalogue of Manuscripts in the Entomology Library of the Natural History Museum, London. 1996.
- John Abbot: Birds, Butterflies and Other Wonders. 1998.
- Butterfly Collectors and Painters. Four centuries of colour plates from The Library Collections of the Natural History Museum London. 2000.
- A Source Book for Biographical Literature on Entomologists. Leiden: Backhuys Publishers. 2007. pp. vii + 694.
