= Alan Hardcastle =

English accountant ans civil servant

Sir Alan John Hardcastle (10 August 1933 – 23 March 2002) was an English accountant and civil servant.

Hardcastle was born on 10 August 1933 to parents who ran three shops in London. In 1951, he entered the firm of B. W. Brixey, accountants, where he trained up and qualified in 1956. He then carried out National Service in the Royal Navy. In 1958, he moved to Peat, Marwick, Mitchell and Co., where he was made partner in 1967 and general partner five years later. He served as president of the Institute of Chartered Accountants from 1983 to 1985.

In 1981, Hardcastle was called on by the government to inspect the St Piran mining company, and in 1986 he was appointed a member of the Bank of England's Board of Banking Supervision. In 1989, he left Peat Marwick when he was appointed Head of the Government Accountancy Service; his salary of £100,000 a year was a record in the civil service. He was in office until 1993 and was responsible for replacing the antiquated cost-accounting methods with modern balance sheets and resource accounting methods. After leaving the government, he became chairman of the regulatory board at Lloyd's of London, serving until 1997. He authored the Board of Banking Supervision's report on the failure of Barings Bank, and in 1998 became chair of the board (which had in that year been brought under the auspices of the Financial Services Authority), serving until 2001. Hardcastle died on 23 March 2002. He had been knighted for his government service in the 1992 Birthday Honours.
