= Desmond Pitcher =

British businessman

Sir Desmond Pitcher
- Born: Desmond Henry Pitcher; 23 March 1935 (age 91); Liverpool
- Education: Liverpool College of Technology

Sir Desmond Henry Pitcher (born 23 March 1935) is a British businessman and former Deputy Chairman of Everton Football Club. He was knighted in 1992 for his services to Merseyside.
