= John Eversley =

British businessman

John Walter Eversley, MBE is the director and vice-chairman of Tyne and Wear Enterprise Trust Ltd. (ENTRUST), in Newcastle upon Tyne. He was appointed MBE in the 1992 Birthday Honours. In 2008, he was awarded the Queen's Award for Enterprise Promotion - the only lifetime achievement awardee that year.
