= John Gerrard Flynn =

British diplomat

John Gerrard Flynn CMG (born 23 April 1937) is a former British Foreign Office diplomat.

He joined the Foreign Office in 1965 and was sent to Lusaka the following year.

He also served in the following positions:

- Assistant Director, Canning House (1970)
- Montevideo, Uruguay, Head of Chancery (1971)
- Luanda, Angola, Chargé d'affaires (1978)
- Brasília, Brazil, Counsellor (political; 1979)
- Madrid, Spain, Counsellor (economic and commercial; 1982)
- Swaziland, High Commissioner (1987–90)
- Ambassador to Angola (1990–93)
- Ambassador to Venezuela (1993–97; concurrently served as non-resident ambassador to the Dominican Republic, 1993–95)
- Foreign Secretary's special representative to Sierra Leone, (1998–present)

== Honours ==
Flynn was named Companion of the Order of St Michael and St George in 1992.
