= Kurt Eversley =

Guyanese-born cricketer (born 1970)

Personal information
- Full name: Kurt Mercer Eversley
- Born: 28 April 1970 (age 56); Guyana
- Batting: Right-handed
- Bowling: Right-arm off break

Domestic team information
- Years: Team
- 2007/08: Turks and Caicos Islands

Career statistics
| Competition | Twenty20 |
|---|---|
| Matches | 1 |
| Runs scored | 0 |
| Batting average | – |
| 100s/50s | –/– |
| Top score | 0* |
| Balls bowled | – |
| Wickets | – |
| Bowling average | – |
| 5 wickets in innings | – |
| 10 wickets in match | – |
| Best bowling | – |
| Catches/stumpings | –/– |
- Source: Cricinfo, 8 March 2012

Kurt Mercer Eversley (born 28 April 1970) is a Guyanese-born former cricketer who played for the Turks and Caicos Islands. Eversley was a right-handed batsman who bowled right-arm off break.

Eversely played a single Twenty20 match for the Turks and Caicos Islands against Montserrat in the 2008 Stanford 20/20 at the Stanford Cricket Ground. He ended the Turks and Caicos Islands innings of 67 unbeaten without scoring. Montserrat went on to win the match by 9 wickets, with Eversley not required to bowl.
