= Trevor Lewis (entomologist) =

British entomologist

Trevor Lewis CBE
- Born: 8 July 1933 (age 92)
- Known for: President of the Royal Entomological Society (1985–1986)
- Awards: CBE (1992)
- Scientific career
- Fields: Entomology
- Institutions: AFRC Institute of Arable Crops Research

Trevor Lewis CBE (born 8 July 1933) is a British entomologist. He was President of the Royal Entomological Society from 1985 to 1986, and was Director of the AFRC Institute of Arable Crops Research, 1989–1993. He was appointed a CBE in 1992.
