= Kerry Bagshaw =

Charles Kerry Bagshaw OBE CMG
- Born: 5 October 1943
- Died: 11 November 2015 (aged 72)
- Occupations: Royal Marine, Intelligence officer
- Known for: Head of MI6's station in Moscow during the collapse of the Soviet Union

Charles Kerry Bagshaw OBE CMG (5 October 1943 – 11 November 2015) was a British Royal Marine and spy who was head of MI6's station in Moscow at the time of the collapse of the Soviet Union.

In May 1999 his name was among 116 leaked to the publication Executive Intelligence Review and later posted on the internet.
