= Joan Harbison =

Northern Irish public servant (1938–2024)

Dame Joan Irene Harbison DBE (21 January 1938 – 21 April 2024) was a Northern Irish public servant and activist. She was a teacher and lecturer who served as Chief Commissioner of the Equality Commission for Northern Ireland until July 2006. Before being appointed Chief Commissioner of the Equality Commission for Northern Ireland she was chairman of the Commission for Racial Equality for Northern Ireland. She was previously the vice chair of the Eastern Health and Social Services Board and the Standing Advisory Commission on Human Rights (SACHR).

Harbison was a member of the General Dental Council for the United Kingdom and the Human Fertilisation and Embryology Authority, as well as serving on the Financial Services Authority Consumer Advisory Panel. She was actively involved in the Citizens Advice Bureau (CAB) for many years and was its chair from 1994 to 1995. She is currently a member of the Judicial Appointments Commission for Northern Ireland and the HPSS Regulation and Quality Improvement Authority.

In 2005, she received an Honorary Degree of Doctor of Laws (LL.D) from the University of Ulster for her contributions to public life in Northern Ireland. She was appointed as an Older People's Advocate on 3 November 2008, in the interim pending the establishment of a full Commissioner for Older People. She was appointed a CBE in 1992 and was made a Dame Commander of the Order of the British Empire (DBE) in 2004 for her contributions to Northern Ireland.

Harbison died in London on 21 April 2024, at the age of 86.
