= Diocese in Europe =

Diocese of the Church of England

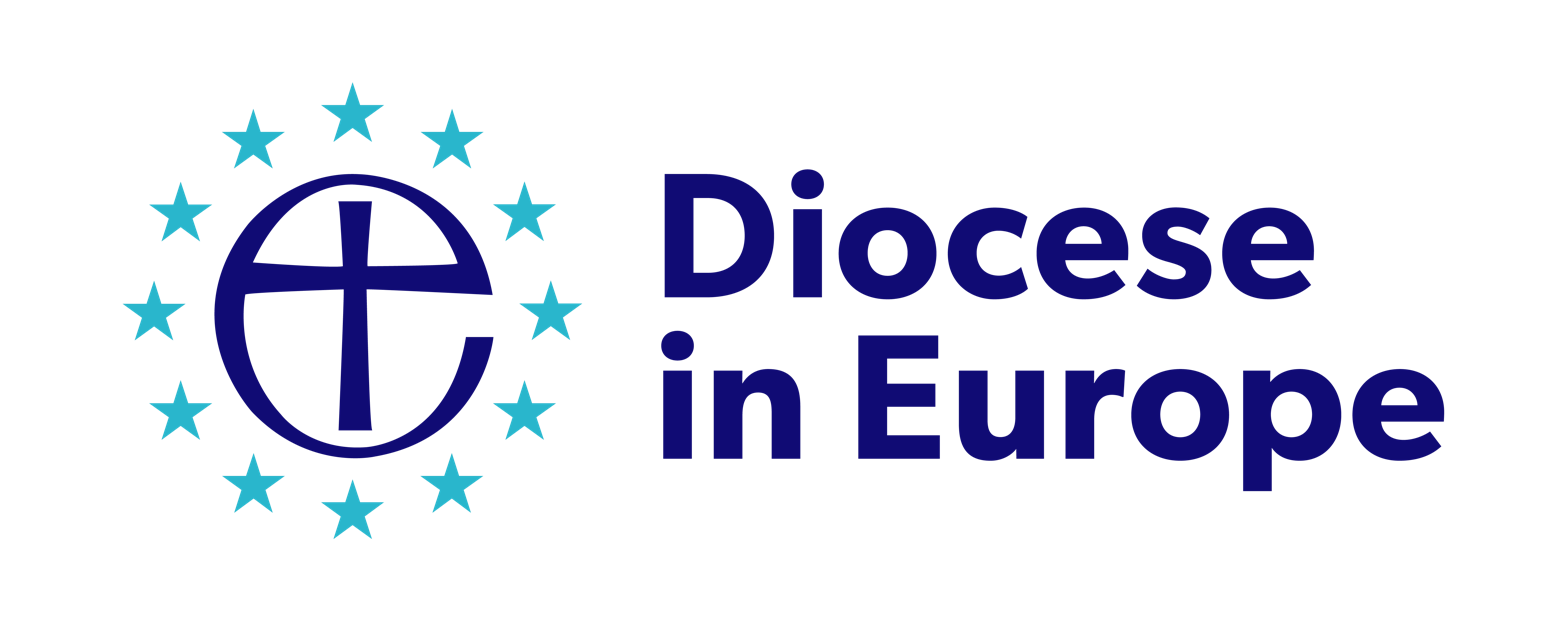

- Coat of arms

- Flag

Location
- Ecclesiastical province: Canterbury
- Archdeaconries: Eastern, France, Germany and Northern Europe, Gibraltar, Italy and Malta, Northwest Europe, Switzerland

Statistics
- Churches: 295

Information
- Cathedral: Cathedral of the Holy Trinity, Gibraltar
- Co-cathedral: St Paul's Pro-Cathedral, Valletta; Holy Trinity Pro-Cathedral, Brussels

Current leadership
- Bishop: Robert Innes
- Suffragan: Andrew Norman, Suffragan Bishop in Europe

Map
- Map of the Diocese in Europe Archdeaconries are colour-coded: Eastern Archdeaconry; Archdeaconry of France; Archdeaconry of North West Europe; Archdeaconry of Germany and Northern Europe; Archdeaconry of Switzerland; Archdeaconry of Gibraltar; Archdeaconry of Italy and Malta

Website
- europe.anglican.org

The Diocese of Gibraltar in Europe, known simply as the Diocese in Europe (DiE), is a diocese of the Church of England. It was originally formed in 1842 as the Diocese of Gibraltar. It is geographically the largest diocese of the Church of England and the largest diocese in the Anglican Communion, covering some one-sixth of the Earth's landmass. Its jurisdiction includes all of Europe (excluding the British Isles), Morocco, Mongolia and the territory of the former Soviet Union.

The diocese is attached to the Church of England Province of Canterbury and is headed by the Bishop in Europe, who is assisted by the Suffragan Bishop in Europe. The present bishop, Robert Innes, was commissioned and consecrated on 20 July 2014, and the suffragan bishop, Andrew Norman, was consecrated on 27 February 2025.

The see cathedral is the Cathedral of the Holy Trinity, Gibraltar, and there are two pro-cathedrals: St Paul's Pro-Cathedral, Valletta, Malta, and the Pro-Cathedral of the Holy Trinity, Brussels, Belgium. The diocese is divided into seven archdeaconries.

== History ==
Church of England churches and congregations were established in Continental European countries before the Reformation. In 1633, overseas churches of the Church of England were placed under the jurisdiction of the Bishop of London. In 1824, the British Foreign Secretary, George Canning, appointed Matthew Luscombe chaplain to the British embassy in Paris and to supervise all Church of England clergy on the continent. Unable to secure the support of the English bishops, Luscombe was consecrated a missionary bishop (i.e. without a See) by the Scottish bishops in 1825, and functioned as a sort of proto-Bishop of Fulham.

The Diocese of Gibraltar was created on 29 September 1842 and at that time covered all Anglican chaplaincies from Portugal to the Caspian Sea. In 1842 (shortly after the See was established), its jurisdiction was described as "Gibraltar, and the Congregations of the Church of England in the Islands and on the Coasts of the Mediterranean"; a map from the same year shows churches at Lisbon, Porto, Gibraltar, Málaga, Marseille, Nice, Tunis, Lucca, Livorno, Florence, Rome, Palermo, Trieste, Valletta, Messina, Naples, Corfu, Zante, Athens, Syra, Smyrna, and Constantinople. From 1926, Church of England parishes in northern Europe became part of the Jurisdiction of North and Central Europe, under the episcopal jurisdiction of the Bishop of London, delegated to the Suffragan Bishop of Fulham.

In 1970, John Satterthwaite was appointed as both Bishop of Fulham and Bishop of Gibraltar, and on 30 June 1980, the Gibraltar Diocese was officially amalgamated with the Jurisdiction of North and Central Europe by the Diocese in Europe Measure 1980 (No. 2). The new united diocese was renamed as the Diocese of Gibraltar in Europe and brought under the authority of the Bishop of Gibraltar in Europe. It has since become commonly known as the Diocese in Europe.

== Archdeaconries ==
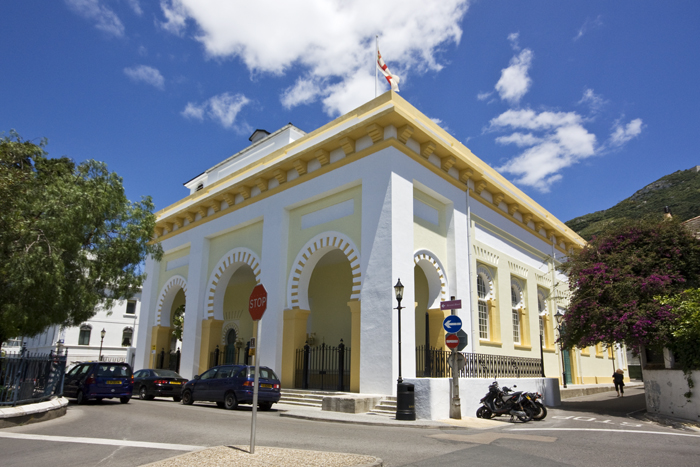
Cathedral of the Holy Trinity

- Eastern Archdeaconry, consisting of: Albania, Armenia, Austria, Azerbaijan, Belarus, Bosnia and Herzegovina, Bulgaria, Croatia, Czech Republic, Georgia, Greece, Hungary, Kosovo, Moldova, Montenegro, North Macedonia, Poland, Romania, Russia, Serbia, Slovakia, Slovenia, Turkey and Ukraine. The previous archdeacon was Patrick Curran, who was based in Vienna, Austria and served 2002–2015. The archdeacon is assisted by two area deans (one in Greater Athens, Greece and one in Moscow, Russia). Colin Williams was full-time archdeacon 2015–2019, taking charge of both the Eastern archdeaconry and that of Germany and Northern Europe, and being based in Frankfurt, Germany; Leslie Nathaniel is Williams' successor full-time in both roles.
- Archdeaconry of Germany and Northern Europe, consisting of: Denmark, Estonia, Finland, Germany, Iceland, Latvia, Lithuania, Norway, and Sweden. The archdeacon is assisted by two area deans; Nathaniel is also Archdeacon of Germany and Northern Europe.
- Archdeaconry of France (including Monaco). The archdeacon is Peter Hooper (2021) who is assisted by three area deans.
- Archdeaconry of Gibraltar, consisting of: Andorra, Gibraltar, Morocco, Portugal, and Spain. The archdeacon is David Waller; the archdeacon is assisted by two area deans.
- Archdeaconry of Italy and Malta. The archdeacon is David Waller. The previous archdeacon was based in Milan, Italy and assisted by one area dean. In Italy, the Archdeaconry operates through the association Chiesa d'Inghilterra, which in 2021 has signed an 'agreement' (Intesa) with the Italian Republic.
- Archdeaconry of North West Europe, consisting of: Belgium, Luxembourg, and the Netherlands. The archdeacon is Sam Van Leer (2021). The archdeacon is assisted by two area deans.
- Archdeaconry of Switzerland. The archdeacon is Peter Hooper (2022).

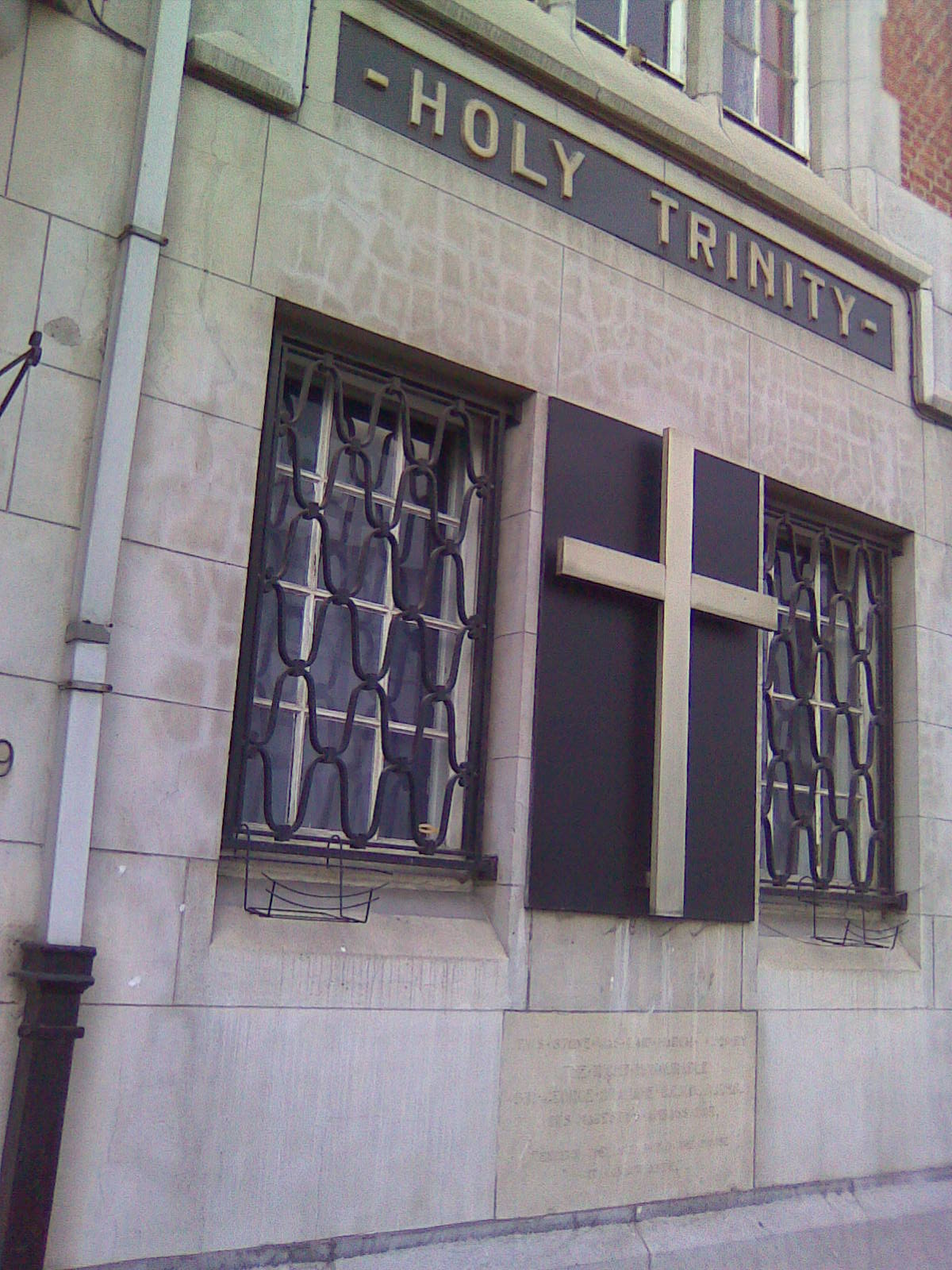
Pro-Cathedral of the Holy Trinity, Brussels.

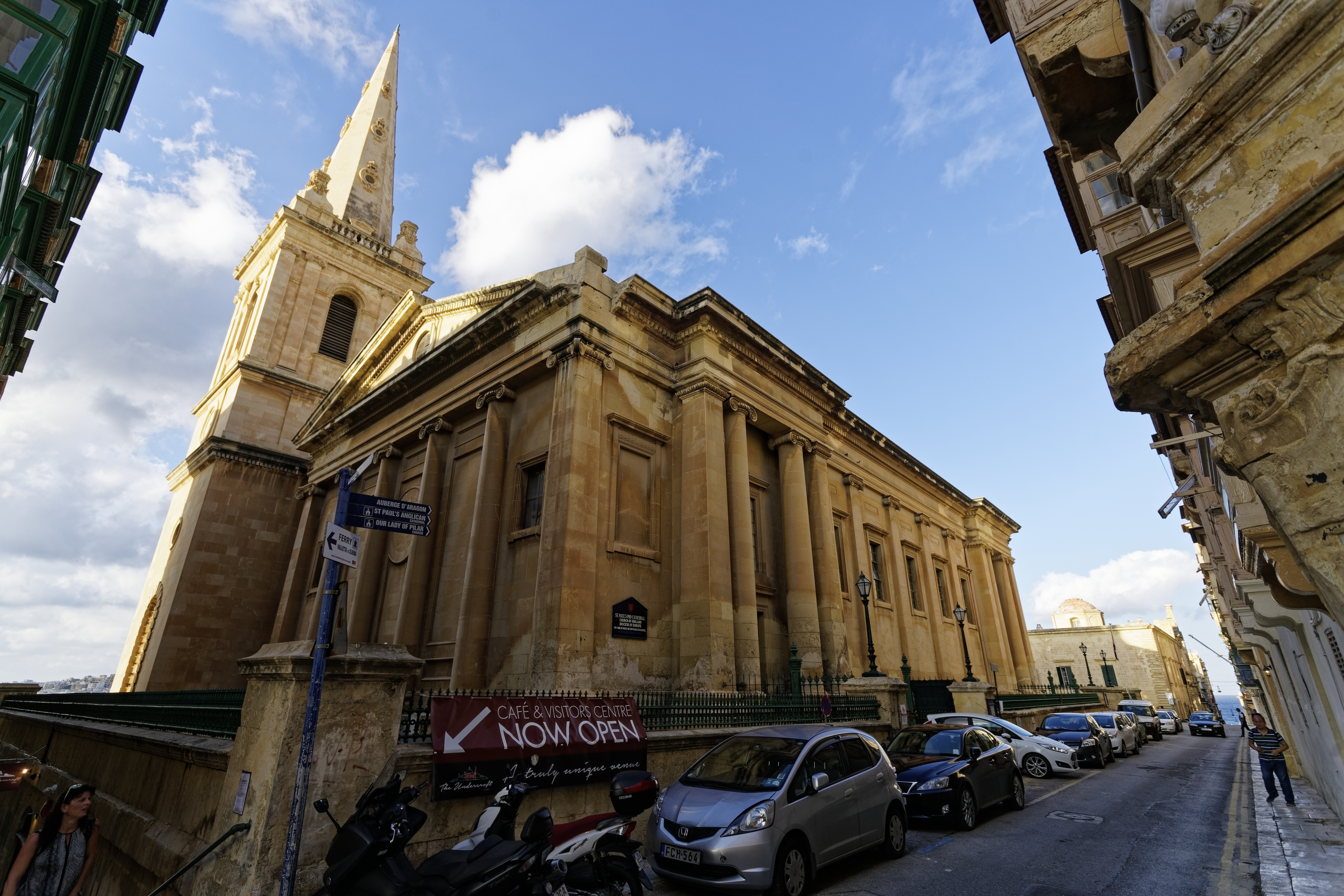
St Paul's Pro-Cathedral, Valletta

== Bishops ==
The diocese is led by the diocesan Bishop in Europe, Robert Innes, and the Suffragan Bishop in Europe, Andrew Norman. The Bishop of Richborough, presently Luke Irvine-Capel, provides alternative episcopal oversight for those chaplaincies which uphold a traditional catholic understanding of Holy Orders (all male), and based on theological convictions, cannot accept the priestly and episcopal ministry of women.

The diocese also licences many honorary assistant bishops to fulfil some episcopal duties across the European diocese. Several of these are the current bishops of other churches in Europe in communion with the Church of England:

- Mark Edington has been the bishop-in-charge of the Convocation of Episcopal Churches in Europe since 2019. He lives in Paris, France.
- Matthias Ring has been the bishop of the Catholic Diocese of the Old Catholics in Germany since 2010; the diocese is based in Bonn, Germany.
- Jorge de Pina Cabral has been the diocesan bishop of the Lusitanian Church since 2012; the diocese is based in Gaia, Portugal.
- Harald Rein has been bishop of the Christian Catholic Church of Switzerland since 2009.

The rest are retired Anglican bishops resident in England. The following are licensed as of April 2020 according to the official diocesan website:

- 2001–present: Richard Garrard, retired Director of the Anglican Centre in Rome and Archbishop's Representative to the Holy See and former Bishop of Penrith, lives in Upper Stoke, Norfolk and is also licensed in the Diocese of Norwich.
- 2002–present: Edward Holland, retired Bishop of Colchester, lives in Hammersmith, Greater London and is licensed in the Diocese of London.
- 2002–present: David Smith, retired Bishop of Bradford, lives in Dunnington, North Yorkshire and is also licensed in York diocese.
- 2003–present: John Flack, retired director of the Anglican Centre in Rome and Archbishop's Representative to the Holy See and former Bishop of Huntingdon, lives in Whittlesey, Cambridgeshire.
- 2003–present: A retired former Bishop of Durham and Bishop of Rochester, Michael Turnbull, lives in Sandwich, Kent.
- 2011–present: retired Bishop of Salisbury David Stancliffe lives in Stanhope, County Durham (he is also licensed in Durham diocese.)
- 2011–present: Stephen Venner, retired Bishop of Dover, current Bishop for the Falkland Islands and Bishop to the Forces, lives in St Albans, Hertfordshire and is also licensed in the Diocese of Rochester.
- 2013–present: retired Bishop of Blackburn Nicholas Reade lives in Bexhill, East Sussex.
- 2014–present: Michael Colclough, retired Canon Pastor of St Paul's Cathedral and former Bishop of Kensington, lives in Chelsea, Greater London, and is also licensed in the Diocese of London.
- 19 October 2016 – present: Martin Wharton, retired Bishop of Newcastle
- 18 October 2017 – present: Richard Chartres, retired Bishop of London
- 22 November 2018 – present: Michael Langrish, retired Bishop of Exeter
- 16 January 2020 – present: Trevor Willmott, retired Bishop of Dover

Additionally, there were several more honorary assistant bishops listed Crockford's Clerical Directory as of March 2014:

- Fernando da Luz Soares, retired bishop of the Lusitanian church, is listed as having been licensed since 1995; he retired in 2013 but remains bishop emeritus of that church and apparently remains in Gaia, Portugal.

== Churches and clergy ==
The diocese currently has 131 clergy occupying stipendiary or full-time posts. However, not every member of the clergy receives a stipend in the same way as clergy in the United Kingdom. Many ministers are entirely supported by their own congregation.

=== Archdeaconry of France ===
Benefice	Churches	Link	Clergy	Ref
Nord-Pas-de-Calais	Calais Anglican Church; Boulogne-sur-Mer Anglican Church; Hesdin Anglican Church		Chaplain: Teena Twelves	
Brittany	Ploërmel Anglican Church; Redon Anglican Church; Huelgoat Anglican Church; Rostrenen Anglican Church		Acting Chaplain: Jeremy Cross	
Coutances (Christ Church in the Manche)	Gratot Hommëel Anglican Church; Virey Anglican Church		Chaplain: Chris Probert	
Dunkerque Mission to Seafarers	Dunkerque Mission to Seafarers		Chaplain: Philip Edell	
Lille (Christ Church)	Christ Church, Lille; Arras Anglican Church (?)		Chaplain: vacant	
Dinard (St Bartholomew)	St Bartholomew, Dinard		Chaplain: Patrick Malone	
Chantilly (St Peter)	St Peter, Chantilly		Chaplain: Ben Evans	
Paris (St George)	St George, Paris		Chaplain: Mark Osborne; Curate: Nicolas Razafindratsima; Associate Chaplain: Jeffrey John	
Paris (St George)	Caen Anglican Chaplaincy		Chaplain: Mark Osborne; Curate: Nicolas Razafindratsima; Associate Chaplain: Jeffrey John	
Paris (St Michael)	St Michael, Paris		Chaplain: James Colwill; Asst Curate: Vivian Sockett	
Maisons-Laffitte (Holy Trinity)	Holy Trinity, Maisons-Laffitte		Chaplain: Charlotte Sullivan; Asst Curate: Claire Smith	
Versailles with Chevry	St Mark, Versailles; St Paul, Gif-sur-Yvette		Chaplain: Stephen March	
Fontainebleau	St Luke, Fontainebleau		Chaplain: Donald McFayden	
(Val de Loire)	Val de Loire English Church		Chaplain: Vacant	
Touraine	St Alcuin of York, Tours meeting; St Alcuin of York, Savigny-en-Véron meeting		Chaplain: John Neal	
Vendée All Saints (Puy-de-Serre, La Chapelle-Achard, & La Chapelle-Palluau)	Puy-de-Serre Anglican Church; La Chapelle-Achard Anglican Church; La Chapelle-Palluau Anglican Church		Chaplain: Hazel Door	
Poitou-Charentes (Christ the Good Shepherd) with Ambernac, Barbezieux-Saint-Hilaire, Chef-Boutonne, Civray, Jarnac, La Rochefoucauld, Magné, Parthenay, Saint-Jean-d'Angély, Verteuil-sur-Charente and Villejésus)	Ambernac Anglican Church; Barbezieux-Saint-Hilaire Anglican Church; Chef-Boutonne Anglican Church; Civray Anglican Church; Jarnac Anglican Church; La Rochefoucauld Anglican Church; Magné Anglican Church; Parthenay Anglican Church; Saint-Jean-d'Angély Anglican Church; Verteui-sur-Charentel Anglican Church; Villejésus Anglican Church		Chaplain: Heather Aston; Asst Chaplain: Florence Rushton	
Strasbourg	St Alban, Strasbourg		Chaplain: Mark Barwick	
Aquitaine (Bordeaux, Chancelade, Cognac, Limeuil, Monteton, & Tocane-Saint-Apre)	Bertric-Burée Anglican Church; Bordeaux Anglican Church; Limeuil Anglican Church; Monteton Anglican Church; Périgueux-Chancelade Anglican Church; Négrondes Anglican Church; Sainte-Nathalène Anglican Church; Condom Anglican Church; Doudrac Anglican Church; Dondas Anglican Church; St Médard Anglican Church; Envals Home Church; Eymet Church (partnered with Eglise Protestante)		Chaplain: John Bavington	
(Biarritz)	St Andrew, Biarritz		Chaplain: Vacant	
Pau (St Andrew)	St Andrew, Pau		Chaplain: Christopher Harrison	
Grenoble	St Mark, Grenoble		Chaplain: John Gay	
Lyon	Trinity, Lyon		Chaplain: Ben Harding; Asst Chaplain: Craig Taylor	
Midi-Pyrénées & Aude (Cahors, Limoux, Puycelsi, Toulouse, Valence-d'Agen)	Brens Anglican Church; Cahors Anglican Church; Carcassonne Anglican Church; Caylus Anglican Church; Toulouse Anglican Church; Vayrac Anglican Church		Chaplain: Paul Willis	
Le Gard	St Michael, Gard		Chaplain: Roy Cole	
(Hérault)	All Saints, Saint-Pargoire		PTO: Roger Smith	
Marseille (All Saints) with Aix-en-Provence	All Saints, Marseille; Aix-en-Provence Anglican Church		Chaplain: Vacant; Asst Chaplain: Roxana Tenea Teleman	
Cannes (Holy Trinity)	Holy Trinity, Cannes		Chaplain: Andy Brewerton	
Beaulieu-sur-Mer (St Michael)	St Michael, Beaulieu-sur-Mer		Chaplain: Vacant	
Nice (Holy Trinity) with Vence	Holy Trinity, Nice; St Hugh, Vence		Chaplain: Jeremy Auld	
Menton (St John)	St John, Menton		Chaplain: Chris Parkman	
Saint-Raphaël (St John the Evangelist) and The Var	St John the Evangelist, Saint-Raphaël; St Francois de Assisi Port Grimaud Ecumenical Church; and The Var		Chaplain: Tom Wilson	
Vernet-les-Bains (St George)	St George, Vernet-les-Bains		Priest-in-Charge: Roy Cole	
Monte Carlo St Paul	St Paul, Monte Carlo		Chaplain: Hugh Bearn	

=== Archdeaconry of North West Europe ===
Benefice	Churches	Link	Clergy	Ref
Brussels Cathedral	Pro-Cathedral of the Holy Trinity, Brussels		Canon Chancellor and Senior Chaplain: Arani Sen; Asst Chaplain: Jean-Bosco Turahirwa	
Antwerp (St Boniface)	St Boniface, Antwerp		Chaplain: Stephen Graham SSC	
Antwerp Mission to Seafarers	Antwerp Mission to Seafarers		Chaplain: Brian Millson	
Ghent (St John)	St John, Ghent; Ghent Mission to Seafarers		Chaplain: Myron Penner	
Knokke (St George)	St George, Knokke		Chaplain: Augustine Nwaekwe	
Bruges (St Peter)	St Peter's Chapel, Bruges; Kortrijk Anglican Church?		Chaplain: Augustine Nwaekwe	
Ostend	Ostend Anglican Church		Chaplain: Augustine Nwaekwe	
Leuven	SS Martha & Mary, Leuven		Chaplain: Sarah-Jane Smith	
Liege	Liège Anglican Church		Chaplain: Paul Yiend	
Tervuren	St Paul, Tervuren		Chaplain: Doninic Newstead	
Charleroi [defunct?]	Christ Church, Charleroi		Chaplain: Vacant	
Ypres (St George)	St George, Ypres		Chaplain: Richard Clement	
Amsterdam (Christ Church)	Christ Church, Amsterdam		Chaplain: David Macha; Asst Chaplain: Vacant	
Heiloo (Christ Church)	Christ Church, Heiloo		Chaplain: Johann Vanderbijl	
(Arnhem-Nijmegen)	Arnhem Anglican Church; Nijmegen Anglican Church		Chaplain: Vacant	
Utrecht (Holy Trinity) with Zwolle	Holy Trinity, Utrecht		Chaplain: Ruan Crew; Asst Chaplain: Grant Crowe; Curate: Christopher Nicholls; Hon. Asst Chaplain: Samuel van Leer	
Utrecht (Holy Trinity) with Zwolle	Zwolle Anglican Church		Chaplain: Ruan Crew; Asst Chaplain: Grant Crowe; Curate: Christopher Nicholls; Hon. Asst Chaplain: Samuel van Leer	
Utrecht (Holy Trinity) with Zwolle	All Saints, Amersfoort		Chaplain: Ruan Crew; Asst Chaplain: Grant Crowe; Curate: Christopher Nicholls; Hon. Asst Chaplain: Samuel van Leer	
Utrecht (Holy Trinity) with Zwolle	Grace Church Groningen		Chaplain: Ruan Crew; Asst Chaplain: Grant Crowe; Curate: Christopher Nicholls; Hon. Asst Chaplain: Samuel van Leer	
Eindhoven	Trinity Church, Eindhoven		Chaplain: Harrison Chinnakumar	
Haarlem	SS Anna & Mary, Haarlem		Chaplain: Bruce Rienstra	
The Hague (St John and St Philip)	SS John & Philip, The Hague		Chaplain: Michael Roden; Assistant Chaplain: Chris Nichols	
Rotterdam (St Mary)	All Saints, Maastricht		Chaplain: Jennifer Pridmore; Curate: Ank Robinson-Muller; Curate: Humayun Sunil	
Rotterdam (St Mary)	St Mary's Church, Rotterdam		Chaplain: Jennifer Pridmore; Curate: Ank Robinson-Muller; Curate: Humayun Sunil	
Rotterdam and Schiedam Missions to Seafarers	Rotterdam & Schiedam Missions to Seafarers		Chaplain: Daniel Odhiambo	
Twente (St Mary the Virgin)	St Mary of Weldam, Twente		Chaplain: Alja Tollefsen van der Lans; Chaplain: Brian Rodford	
Vlissingen (Flushing) Missions to Seafarers	Vlissingen Mission to Seafarers		Chaplain: Vacant	
Voorschoten	St James, Voorschoten		Chaplain: Matt Thijs	
Luxembourg Konvikt Chapel	Luxembourg Anglican Church		Chaplain: Geoffrey Read	

=== Archdeaconry of Germany and Northern Europe ===
Benefice	Churches	Link	Clergy	Ref
Berlin (St George's)	St George's, Berlin		Chaplain: Christopher Jage-Bowler	
Berlin (St George's)	Dresden Anglican Gathering		Chaplain: Christopher Jage-Bowler	
Bonn with Cologne	Bonn Anglican Church; Cologne Anglican Church		Chaplain: Michael Bullock; Asst Chaplain: Richard Gardiner	
Hamburg (St Thomas À Becket)	St Thomas a Becket, Hamburg		Chaplain: Vacant	
Düsseldorf Christ Church	Christ Church, Düsseldorf		Chaplain: Stephen Walton	
Düsseldorf Christ Church	Christ Church, Essen		Chaplain: Stephen Walton	
Freiburg im Breisgau	Freiburg-im-Breisgau Anglican Church		Chaplain: Christopher Parsons	
Heidelberg	Heidelberg English Church		Chaplain: John K. Newsome	
Leipzig	Leipzig English Church		Chaplain: Martin Reakes-Williams	
Stuttgart St Catherine	St Catherine, Stuttgart		Chaplain: Antonio Ablon	
Copenhagen (St Alban) with Aarhus	St Alban, Copenhagen; Aarhus Anglican Church		Chaplain: Vacant	
Oslo St Edmund with Bergen, Trondheim and Stavanger	St Edmund, Oslo; Bergen Anglican Church; Drammen (occasional services); Tromsø (occasional services)		Senior Chaplain: Joanna Udal; Asst Curate: Jacob Quick	
Oslo St Edmund with Bergen, Trondheim and Stavanger	Trondheim Anglican Church		Senior Chaplain: Joanna Udal; Asst Curate: Jacob Quick	
Oslo St Edmund with Bergen, Trondheim and Stavanger	Stavanger Anglican Church; Kristiansand (occasional services)		Senior Chaplain: Joanna Udal; Asst Curate: Jacob Quick	
(Balestrand)	St Olaf, Balestrand		Chaplain: Summer locums	
Stockholm (St Peter and St Sigfrid) with Gävle and Västerås	St Peter and St Sigfrid's Church, Stockholm		Chaplain: Nicholas Howe	
Gothenburg (St Andrew) w Halmstad, Jönköping & Uddevalla	St Andrew, Gothenburg		Chaplain: Alja Tollefsen-van der Lans	
Helsinki [see Anglican Church in Finland]	Chaplaincy of St Nicholas, Helsinki; Kerava; Kuopio; Mikkeli; Oulu; Pori; Christ the King, Tampere; Turku; White Nile Congregation, Vaasa		Chaplain: Tuomas Mäkipää; Asst Chaplain: David Oliver	
Tallinn (St Timothy and St Titus)	SS Timothy & Titus, Tallinn		Chaplain: Gustav Piir	
Riga	St Saviour, Riga		Chaplain: Elīza Zikmane	
Anglican Congregation Iceland	Reykjavik Anglican Church		Chaplain: Bjarni Bjarnason	

=== Archdeaconry of Switzerland ===
Benefice	Churches	Link	Clergy	Ref
Zurich (St Andrew) with Baden, St Gallen and Zug	St Andrew, Zurich; Baden Anglican Church; St Gallen Anglican Church; Zug Anglican Church		Chaplain: Jackie Sellin	
Montreux (St John) with Anzere, Gstaad and Monthey	St John, Montreux; Anzère (occasional services); Gstaad (occasional services); Monthey Anglican Church; Villars Anglican Church		Chaplain: Vacant	
Basle	Basel Anglican Church		Chaplain: Dorothea Bertschmann; Asst Chaplain: Anne Lowen	
Berne	St Ursula, Berne; Thun Anglican Church; Biel/Bienne Anglican Church		Chaplain: Helen Marshall	
Geneva (Holy Trinity)	Holy Trinity, Geneva		Chaplain: Daphne Green	
La Cote	Gingins Anglican Church; Divonne-les-Bains Anglican Church		Chaplain: Carolyn Cooke; Asst Chaplain: Betty Talbot	
Lausanne (Christ Church) with Neuchâtel	Christ Church, Lausanne		Chaplain: John Tomlinson	
Lugano (St Edward the Confessor)	St Edward the Confessor, Lugano		Chaplain: Paul Hrynczyszyn	
Vevey (All Saints) with Château D'oex	Château D'Oex Anglican Church; Neuchâtel Anglican Church		Chaplain: Mark Fletcher; Asst Chaplain: Seth Barker	
(Interlaken) (Kandersteg)	Interlaken Anglican Chaplaincy; Kandersteg Anglican Chaplaincy		Chaplain: Summer seasonal	
(Mürren) (St Moritz)	Murren Anglican Chaplaincy; St Moritz Anglican Chaplaincy		Chaplain: Winter seasonal	
(Wengen)	St Bernard, Wengen		Chaplain: Summer/winter seasonal	
(Zermatt)	St Peter, Zermatt		Chaplain: Winter seasonal	

=== Archdeaconry of Gibraltar ===
Benefice	Churches	Link	Clergy	Ref
Gibraltar Cathedral	Cathedral of the Holy Trinity, Gibraltar		Dean: Ian Tarrant; Canon Theologian: Robin Gill	
Madrid (St George)	St George, Madrid		Chaplain: Sally-Anne McDougall	
Barcelona St George	St George's Church, Barcelona		Chaplain: John Chapman	
Barcelona St George	St George, Andorra		Chaplain: John Chapman	
Costa de Almería	Albox Anglican Church; Mojacar Anglican Church; Llanos del Peral Anglican Church; Roquetas de Mar Anglican Church		Chaplain: Denis Bradshaw	
Costa Azahar (St Christopher)	St Christopher, Alcossebre; Vinaros Anglican Church; L'Ampolla Anglican Church		Chaplain: vacant	
Costa Blanca	Albir Anglican Church; Alfas del Pi Anglican Church; Calpe Anglican Church; Denia Anglican Church; El Campello Anglican Church; Gandia Anglican Church; Javea Anglican Church; La Fustera Anglican Church		Lead Chaplain: Paul Dean; Asst Chaplain: Rod Middleton; Asst Chaplain : James Booker	
Costa Brava (St Stephen)	Madremanya Anglican Church; Sant Marti, Pau Anglican Church; Penedes Anglican Church; Lloret de Mar Anglican Church		Chaplain: Vacant	
Costa del Sol East (Fuengirola St Andrew, Benalmádena Costa, Calahonda, Coin)	Alhaurín El Grande Anglican Church; St Andrew, Fuengirola; Benalmadena Anglican Church; Calahonda Anglican Church		Chaplain: William Small	
Costa del Sol West (San Pedro De Alcantara with Estepona, Algeciras and Sotogrande)	San Pedro Anglican Church; Sotogrande Anglican Church		Chaplain: Anthony Carroll	
Málaga (St George)	St George, Málaga; Vélez-Málaga Anglican Church; The Salinas Anglican Congregation		Chaplain: Louis Darrant; Asst Chaplain: Doreen Cage	
Nerja and Almuñécar	Nerja Anglican Church; Almuñécar Anglican Church		Chaplain: Vacant	
Torrevieja [Chaplaincy of SS Peter & Paul]	Calasparra Anglican Church; Campoverde Anglican Church; La Manga Anglican Church; La Marina Anglican Church; La Regia Anglican Church; La Siesta Anglican Church; Lago Jardín Anglican Church; Los Balcones Anglican Church		Chaplain: Richard Seabrook	
Palma de Mallorca (St Philip and St James)	SS Philip & James, Palma de Mallorca; Cala Bona Anglican Church; Puerto Pollensa Anglican Church; Puerto Soller Anglican Church; Cala d'Or Anglican Church		Chaplain: The Very Revd. Ishanesu Gusha; Asst Chaplain: Sara Davies	
Menorca	Es Castell (Menorca) Anglican Church; Cala en Porter Anglican Church; Ciutadella Anglican Church		Chaplain: Paul Strudwick	
Ibiza	Es Caná, Ibiza; Formentera Anglican Church; Sant Rafael Anglican Church; Santa Eulalia Anglican Church		Chaplain: Vacant	
Lisbon (St George) with Estoril (St Paul)	St George, Lisbon; St Paul, Estoril		Chaplain: Beth Bendrey; Asst Chaplain: Ian Bendrey; Asst Curate: Daleen Bakker	
Porto (or Oporto) (St James)	St James' Church, Porto; Ponte de Lima Anglican Church		Chaplain: Colin Jones	
Algarve St. Vincent's	Eastern Algarve (St Luke, Gorjões); Western Algarve (Praia Da Luz); Central Algarve (Boliqueime)		Chaplain: Rob Kean; Asst Chaplain: Carla Vicêncio Prior	
Tenerife South (St Eugenio) [Church of St Francis]	Los Gigantes Anglican Church; San Eugenio Anglican Church; San Blas Anglican Church		Chaplain: Vacant	
Las Palmas (Holy Trinity)	Holy Trinity, Las Palmas; Playa del Ingles Anglican Church		Chaplain: David Brown	
Puerto de la Cruz (All Saints) with La Palma	All Saints, Puerto de la Cruz; La Palma Anglican Church		Chaplain: Fiona Jack	
Fuerteventura	St James, Fuerteventura		Chaplain: Anne Brown	
Lanzarote [St Laurence's Chaplaincy]	Nazaret Anglican Church; Puerto del Carmen Anglican Church; Playa Blanca Anglican Church		Chaplain: Vacant	
Madeira (Holy Trinity)	Holy Trinity, Madeira		Chaplain: Vacant	
Casablanca (St John the Evangelist)	St John the Evangelist, Casablanca		Chaplain: Titus Oluwalusi	
Tangier St Andrew	St Andrew, Tangier		Chaplain: Vacant	

=== Archdeaconry of Italy and Malta ===
Benefice	Churches	Link	Clergy	Ref
Malta and Gozo	Pro-Cathedral & Collegiate Church of St Paul, Malta; Holy Trinity, Sliema; Our Lady and St. George, Gozo	Chancellor: David Wright; Chaplain (Sliema): Clement Upton		
Rome All Saints	All Saints, Rome; Padova Anglican Church; St Mary at the Cross, Macerata; St John the Baptist, Citta' della Pieve		Vicar: Robert Warren	
Florence (St Mark) with Siena (St Peter) and Bologna	St Mark, Florence; St Peter, Siena; Holy Cross, Bologna		Chaplain: Chris Williams	
Genoa Holy Ghost with Alassio	Holy Ghost, Genoa		Chaplain: Monthly rota	
Milan (All Saints) with Lake Como	All Saints, Milan; Ascension, Lake Como		Chaplain: James Hadley	
Milan (All Saints) with Lake Como	St John the Baptist, Varese		Chaplain: James Hadley	
Naples Christ Church with Sorrento, Capri and Bari	Christ Church, Naples; Bari Anglican Church; Capri Anglican Church; Sorrento Anglican Church		Chaplain: vacant	
Venice St George with Trieste	St George, Venice; Aviano Anglican Church; Trieste Anglican Church		Chaplain: Lucinda Laird	
Sicily	Holy Cross, Palermo		Chaplain: James Thomas Hadley	
Sicily	SANT'ALBERTO, Randazzo; Cappellano/ Parroco: Rev. Padre Giovanni La Rosa	St George, Taormina	Chaplain: Shawn Denney	
Assisi	Assisi Anglican Church		Chaplain: Patrick Woodhouse	
(Bordighera)	Bordighera Anglican Church [Defunct?]		Chaplain: Vacant?	
(Perugia)	Perugia (occasional services)			

=== Eastern Archdeaconry ===
Benefice	Churches	Link	Clergy	Ref
Vienna (Christ Church)	Christ Church, Vienna; CityKirche Wien; Innsbruck (occasional services); Klagenfurt (occasional services); Bratislava (occasional services)		Chaplain: vacant; Asst Curate: Michael Dormandy; Asst Curate: Samuel Haiser	
Vienna (Christ Church)	Ljubljana Anglican Church		Chaplain: vacant; Asst Curate: Michael Dormandy; Asst Curate: Samuel Haiser	
Vienna (Christ Church)	Zagreb Anglican Church		Chaplain: vacant; Asst Curate: Michael Dormandy; Asst Curate: Samuel Haiser	
Warsaw	Warsaw Anglican Church		Chaplain: Kasta Dip; Asst Curate: Yuriy Yurchyk	
Prague	St Clement, Prague; Brno Anglican Church		Chaplain: Nathanial Nathanial	
Budapest	St Margaret of Scotland, Hungary; Zalaszántó?		Chaplain: Frank Hegedűs; Asst Curate: John Wilson; Asst Curate: Ádám Bak	
Belgrade with Skopje	St Mary, Belgrade; Sarajevo Anglican Church; Skopje Anglican Church		Chaplain: Robin Fox	
Bucharest (The Resurrection)	Resurrection, Bucharest; Sofia Anglican Church		Chaplain: Nevsky Everett	
Greater Athens	St Paul, Athens; Thessaloniki Anglican Church; Andros?; Kifissia?; Nafplion		Chaplain: Benjamin Drury; Curate: Christine Saccali; Assistant Chaplain: Bruce Bryant-Scott (St Thomas)	
Greater Athens	St Thomas the Apostle, Kefalas (Crete)		Chaplain: Benjamin Drury; Curate: Christine Saccali; Assistant Chaplain: Bruce Bryant-Scott (St Thomas)	
Greater Athens	St Andrew, Patras		Chaplain: Benjamin Drury; Curate: Christine Saccali; Assistant Chaplain: Bruce Bryant-Scott (St Thomas)	
Corfu Holy Trinity	Holy Trinity, Corfu; Lefkada Anglican Church		Chaplain: Julian Wilson	
Kyiv (Christ Church)	Christ Church, Kyiv		Chaplain: Locum placements	
Odesa Mission to Seafarers	Odesa Mission to Seafarers		Chaplain: Vacant	
Moscow (St Andrew) with Vladivostok	St Andrew, Moscow; Vladivostok?		Chaplain: Arun John	
St Petersburg	St Petersburg Anglican Church		Chaplain: Vacant	
Istanbul (Christ Church) (Chapel of St Helena) with Moda	Crimea Memorial Church, Istanbul; St Helena's Chapel, Istanbul; All Saints, Moda		Chaplain: Ian Sherwood	
(Pera)	Resurrection, Pera		Chaplain: ?	
Ankara (St Nicholas)	St Nicolas, Ankara		Chaplain: Vacant	
İzmir (St John the Evangelist) with Bornova (St Mary Magdalene)	St John the Evangelist, İzmir; St Mary Magdalene, İzmir		Chaplain: James Buxton	
(Didim)	St Mary, Didim		Chaplain: Vacant?	
Tbilisi	Tbilisi Anglican Church		Chaplain: Vacant	
Yerevan	Yerevan Anglican Church		Chaplain: Vacant	
Baku	Baku Anglican Church		Chaplain: Vacant	

== See also ==
- Convocation of Episcopal Churches in Europe – an Anglican jurisdiction in Europe representing the Episcopal Church in the United States of America
- Catholic Diocese of the Old Catholics in Germany – Old Catholic church in Germany
- Lusitanian Catholic Apostolic Evangelical Church – Anglican church in Portugal
- Spanish Reformed Episcopal Church – Anglican church in Spain
