= Holy Trinity Church, Geneva =

Anglican Church in Geneva, Switzerland

Coordinates: 46.208056°N 6.146389°E

Holy Trinity Church
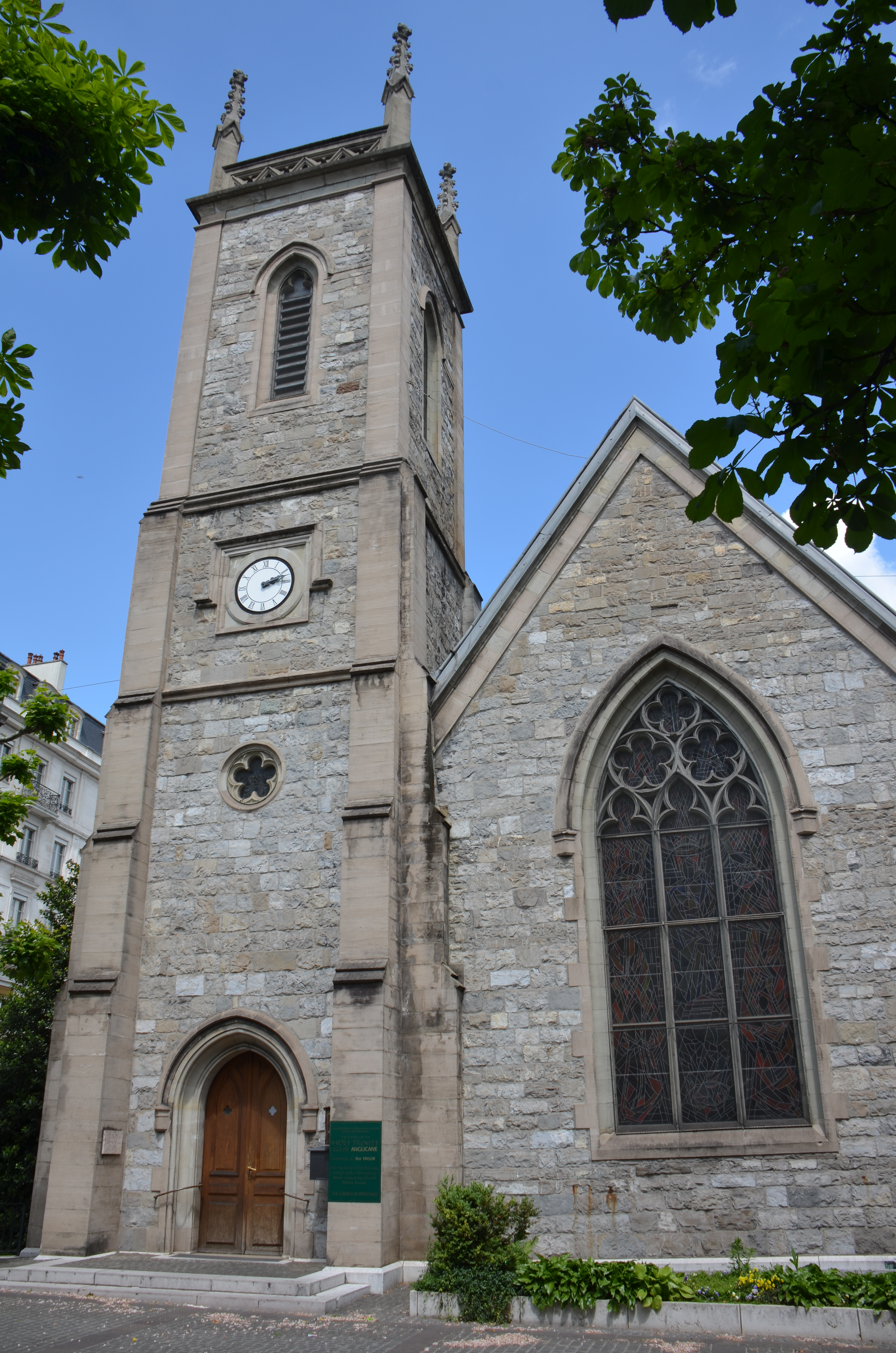
- The Church of the Holy Trinity (eglise anglicane)
- Holy Trinity Church
- Location: Rue du Mont-Blanc, Geneva
- Country: Switzerland
- Denomination: Church of England
- Churchmanship: Modern catholic
- Website: holytrinitygeneva.org

History
- Dedication: Holy Trinity
- Consecrated: 30 August 1853

Architecture
- Heritage designation: Class B

Administration
- Diocese: Diocese in Europe
- Archdeaconry: Archdeaconry of Switzerland

Holy Trinity Church, Geneva, Switzerland, was completed in 1853. The church is located at rue du Mont-Blanc, between the Genève-Cornavin railway station and the famous hotels at the banks of Lake Geneva. The church is part of the Diocese in Europe of the Church of England and is also a Swiss monument of regional significance (class B).

== History ==
In 1555 services in English had been celebrated according to the rites of the Geneva Reformed Church for Marian exiles. The place of worship has been in the Church of Sainte-Marie-la-Neuve (Auditoire). One year later John Knox was elected as minister. The first Anglican worship was held by Rev. Gilbert Burnet in 1685.

There has been organised Anglican worship in the Old Hospital Chapel (place du Bourg de Four) since 1814. In 1846 the English community decided to build a church of their own. Land was given by the State of Geneva, and the foundation stone was laid by Charles Sumner, Bishop of Winchester in 1851. The construction was entirely financed by private subscription. Sumner returned to consecrate the church on 30 August 1853.

The East window was presented by Mrs. Jephson in 1884. The other stained-glass windows had been created by Jacques Wasem from 1958 to 1981. The Parish hall was constructed in 1966. Renovations took place in 1976 and from 1983 to 1985. The new organ had been installed in 1985 and updated in 2015. The church has many plaques and memorials to individuals who died in Geneva or in the Swiss Alps.

A new constitution was adopted in 1910. Holy Trinity became a society instead of a foundation. The 150th anniversary of the church was celebrated with an exhibition at the Geneva State Archives. The catalogue "The Welcoming City: English Speaking Protestants from 1555 to the present day" was printed in French and English.

== Gallery ==
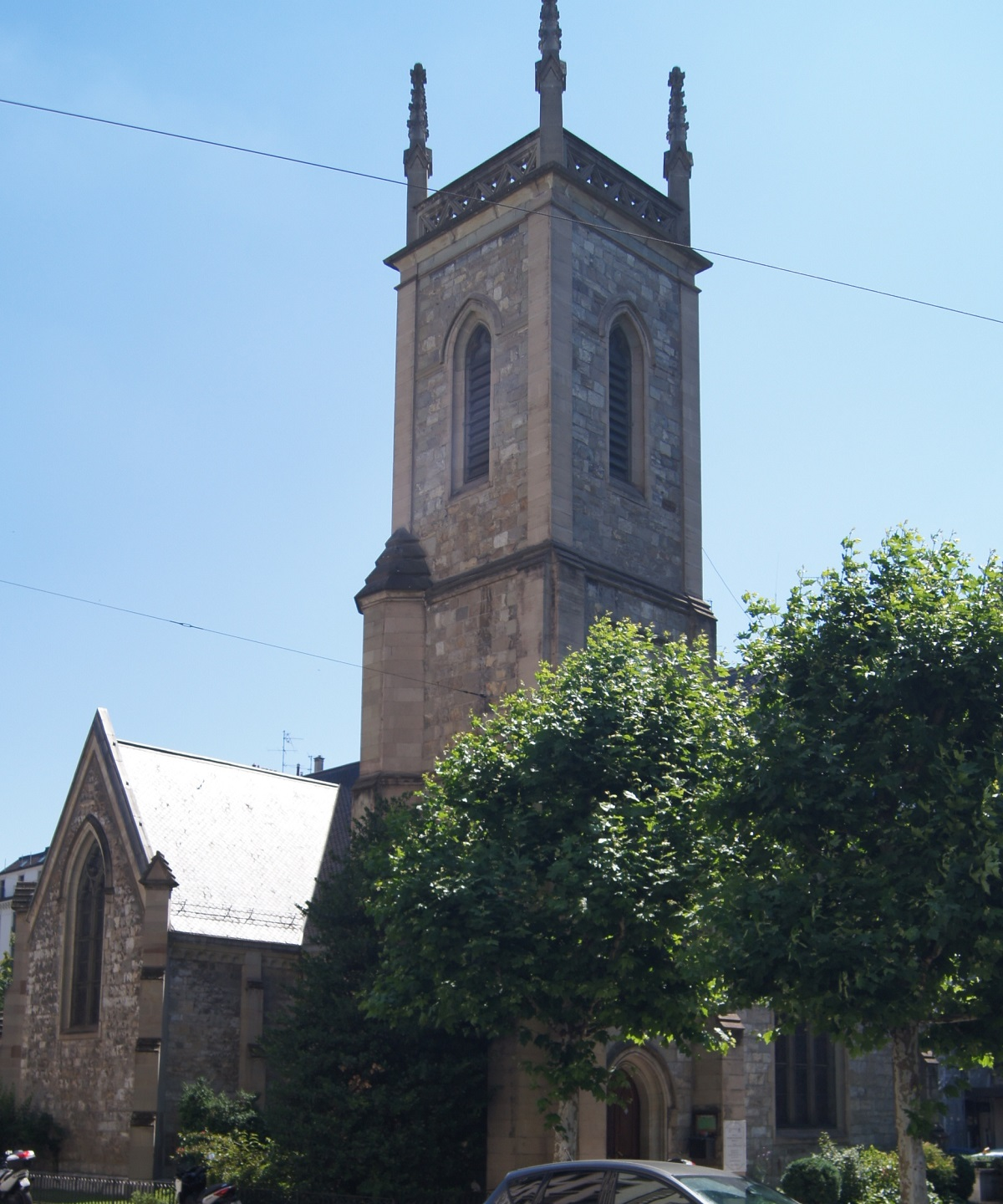

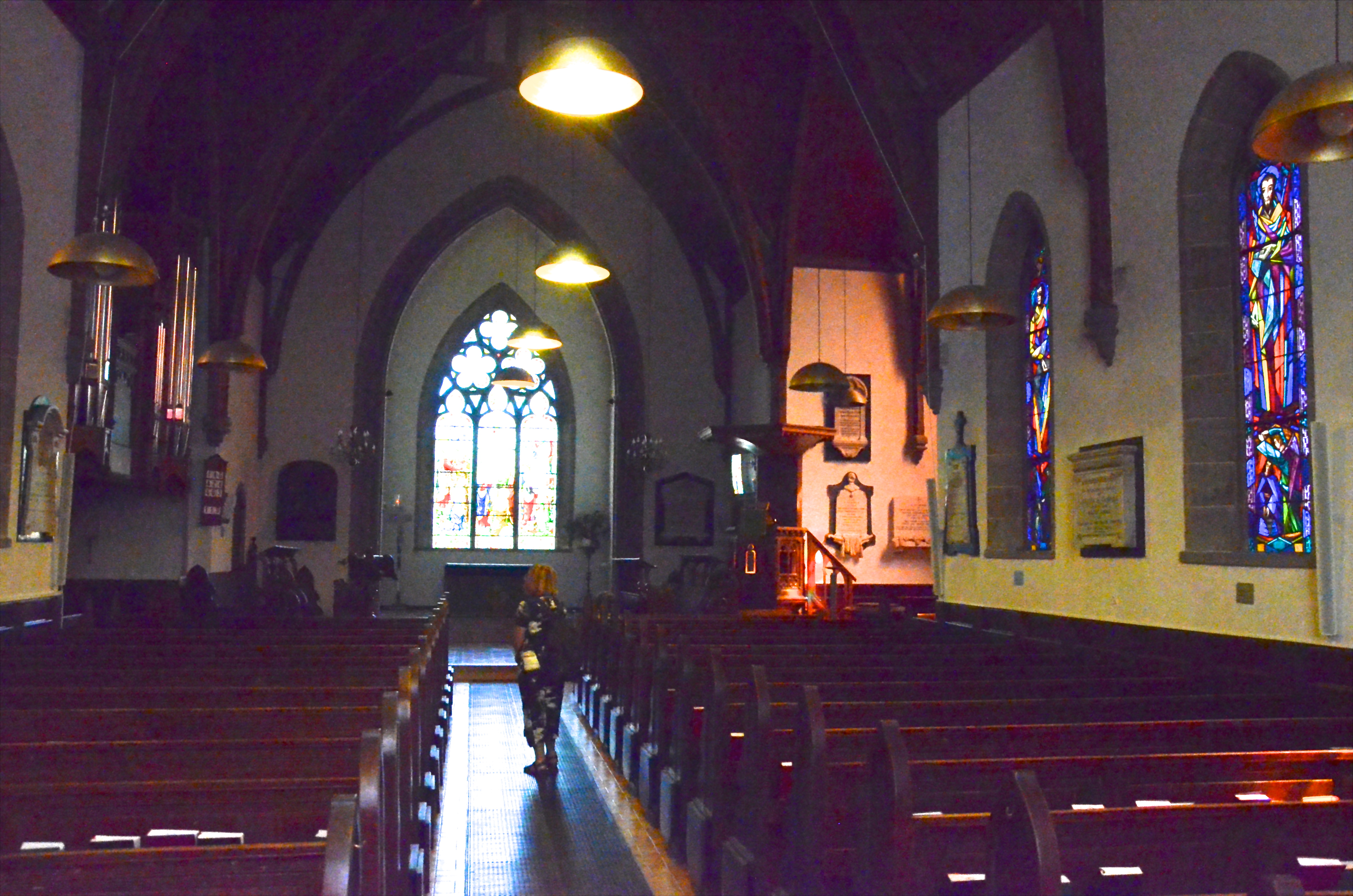

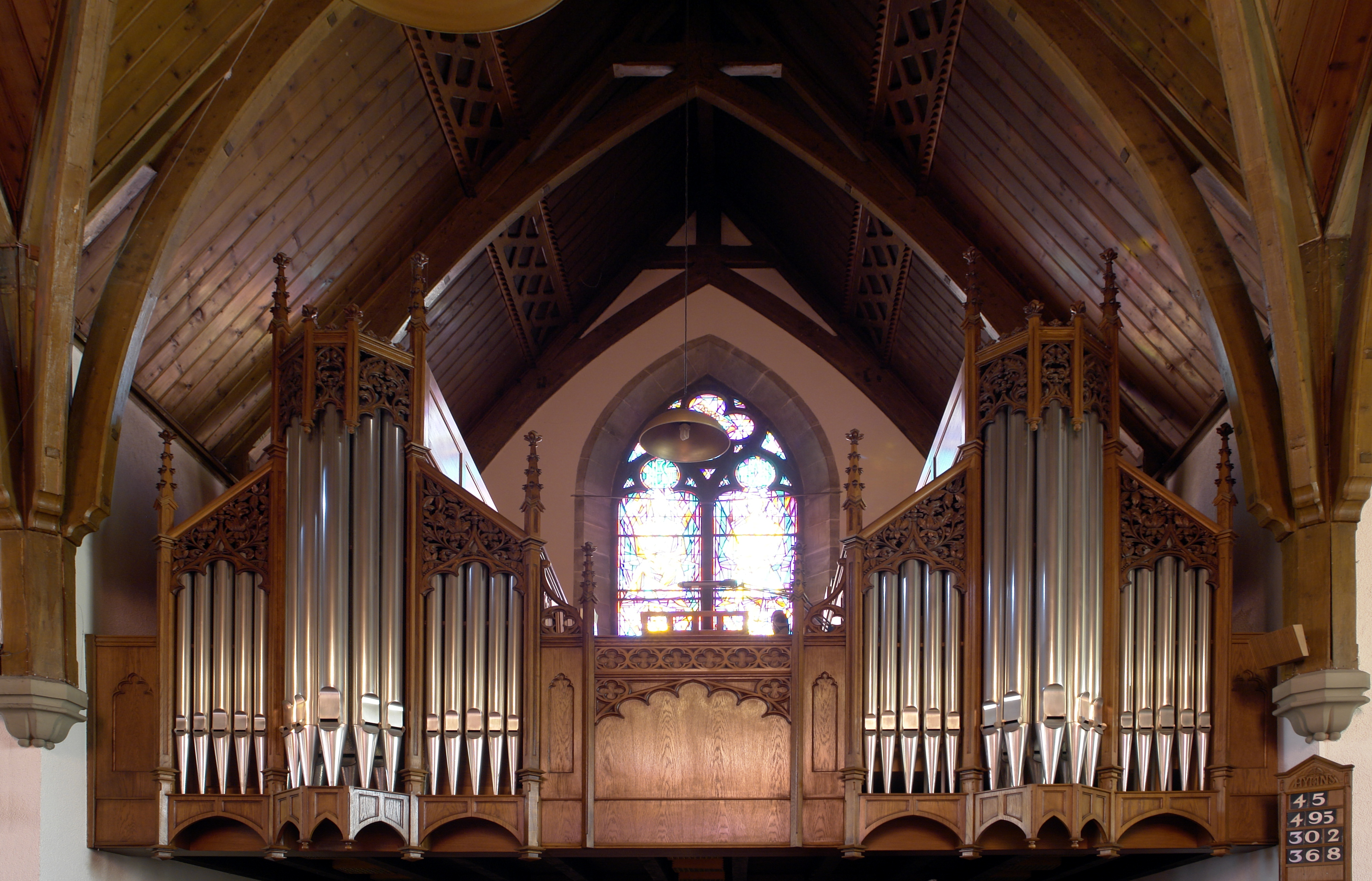

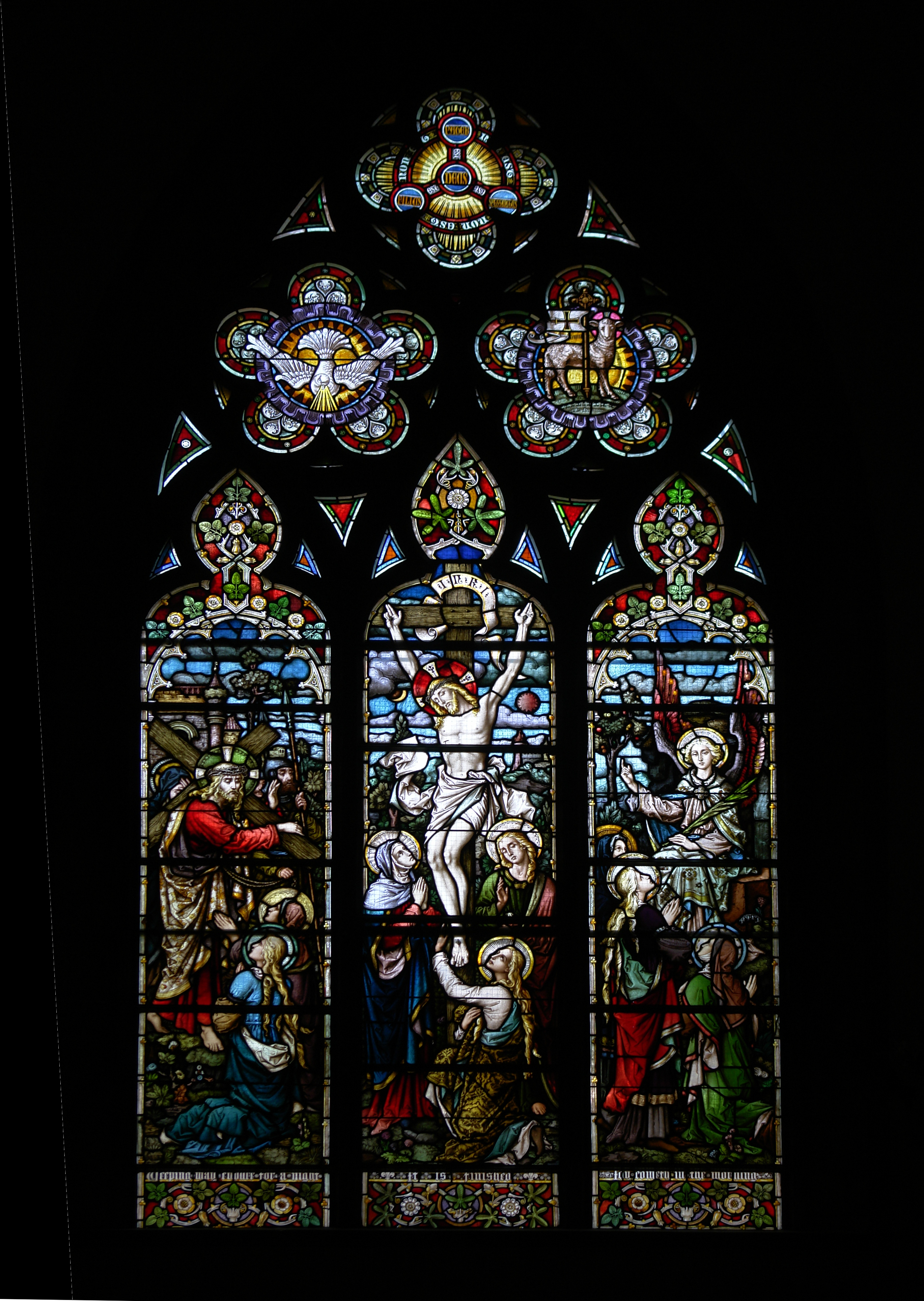

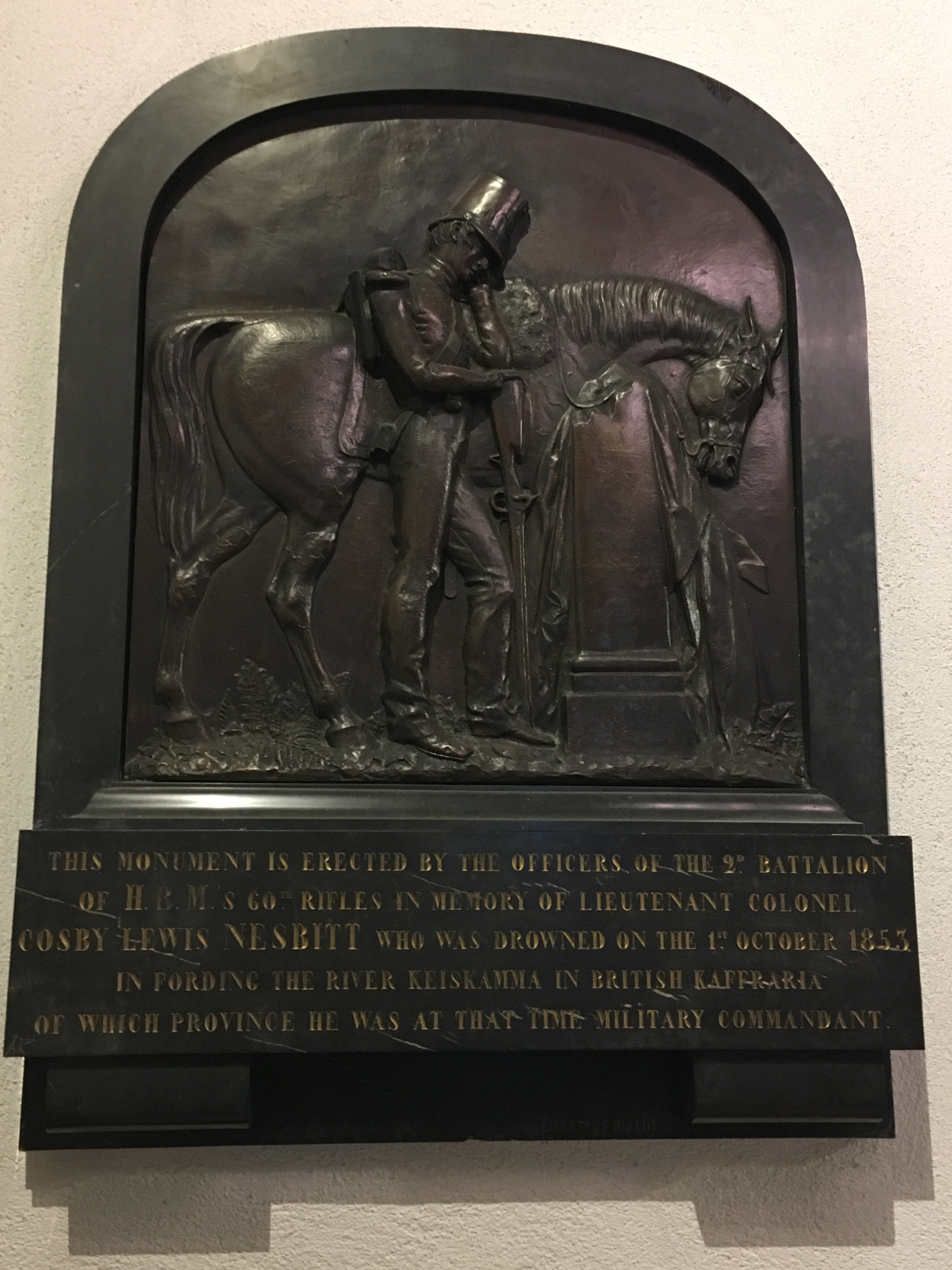

== See also ==
- Christ Church Lausanne
