= Andrew Norman (bishop) =

Andrew Robert Norman (born 26 January 1963) is a British Anglican bishop serving as Suffragan Bishop in Europe since 2025.

He was educated at Ardingly College and subsequently read PPE at University College, Oxford graduating in 1984. He further attended Selwyn College, Cambridge (MA Theology, 1999) and the University of Birmingham (MPhil Missiology, 2007).

He was Principal of Ridley Hall, Cambridge between November 2008 and December 2016. In January 2017 he took up the post of Director of Ministry and Mission in the Diocese of Leeds.

On 30 November 2024, he was announced as the next Suffragan Bishop in Europe, the suffragan bishop of the Diocese in Europe. He was consecrated into bishop's orders on morning of 27 February 2025 at Canterbury Cathedral.
