= St George's Church, Venice =

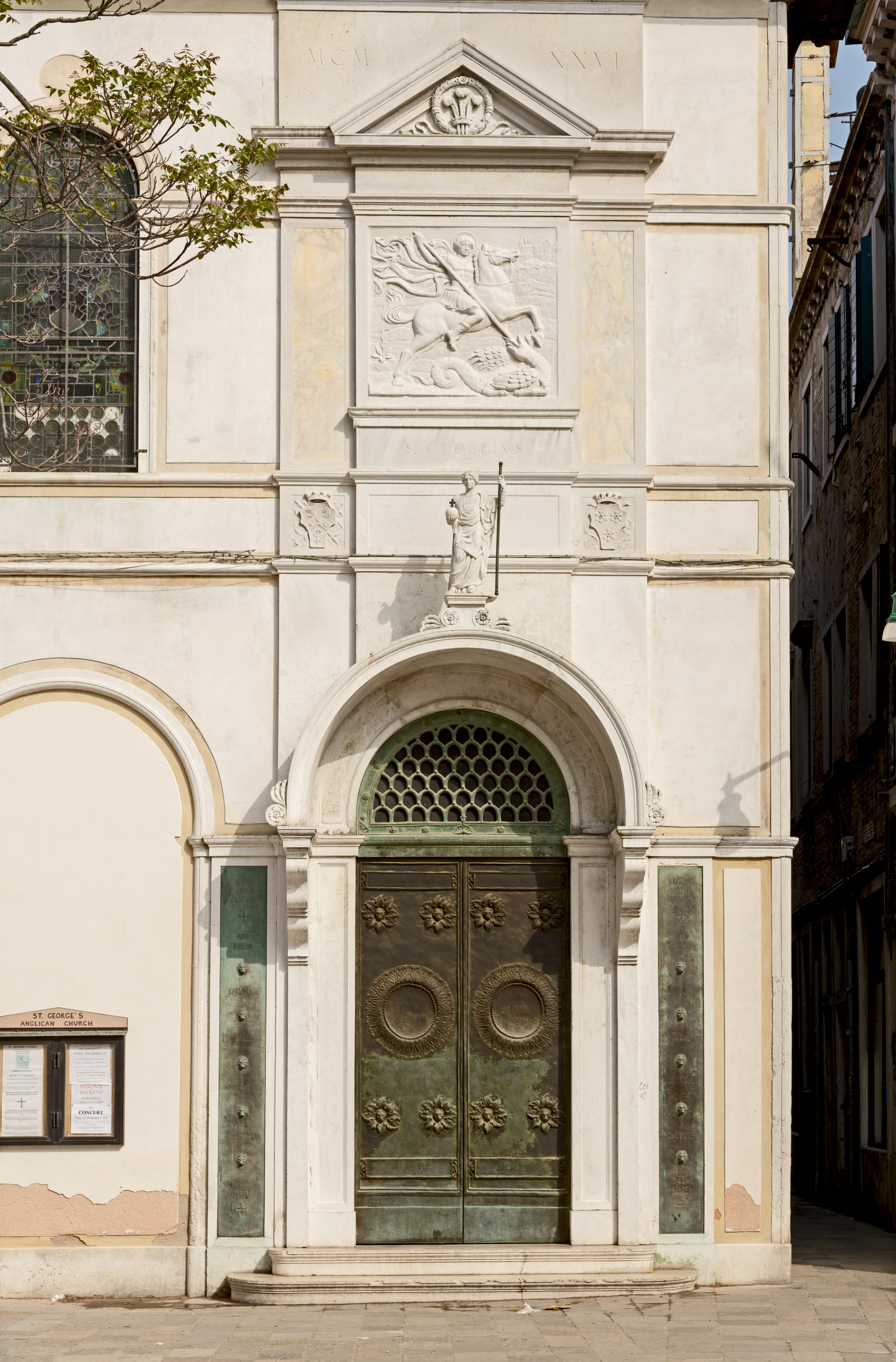
- St George's Church, entrance
- St George's Church, Venice
- 45°25′50.20″N 12°19′48.954″E
- Location: Venice
- Country: Italy
- Denomination: Anglican
- Website: stgeorgesvenice.org

History
- Dedication: St George
- Dedicated: 1892

Administration
- Diocese: Diocese in Europe
- Archdeaconry: Archdeaconry of Italy and Malta

St George's Church, Venice is an Anglican parish church in Venice, Italy in the Diocese in Europe.

== History ==
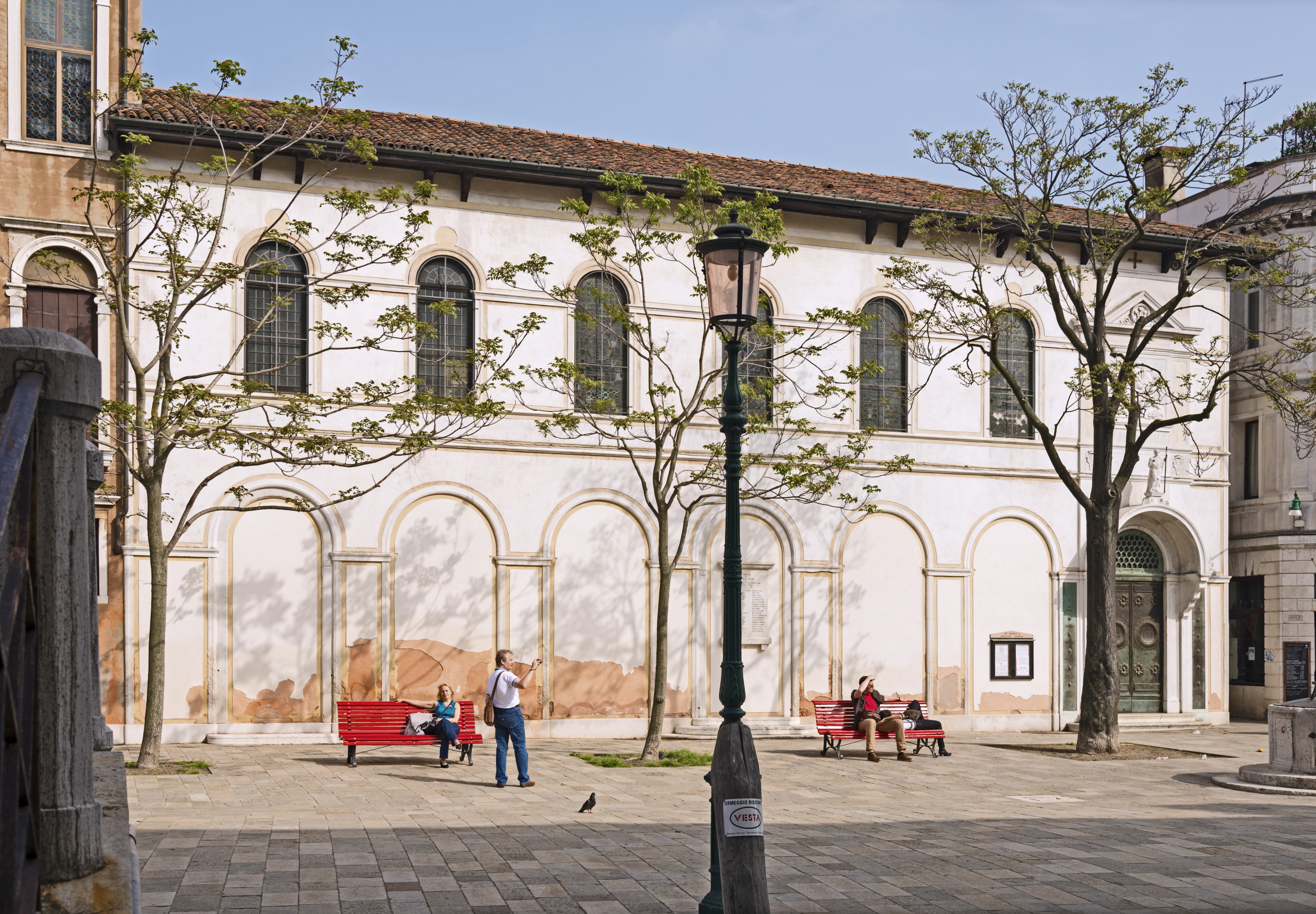
St George's Church

The church was established by the Revd. John Davies Mereweather, Cavaliere della Corona d'Italia, who had settled in Venice. He held services in his flat in the Palazzo Contarini-Corfu until 1887.

The current church building in the Campo San Vio was formerly the warehouse for the Venezia-Murano Glass and Mosaic Company. It was built to a design by engineer Luigi Marangoni, with sculptures by Napoleone Martinuzzi and dedicated in 1892.
