= La Mothe-Achard =

- Part of Les Achards
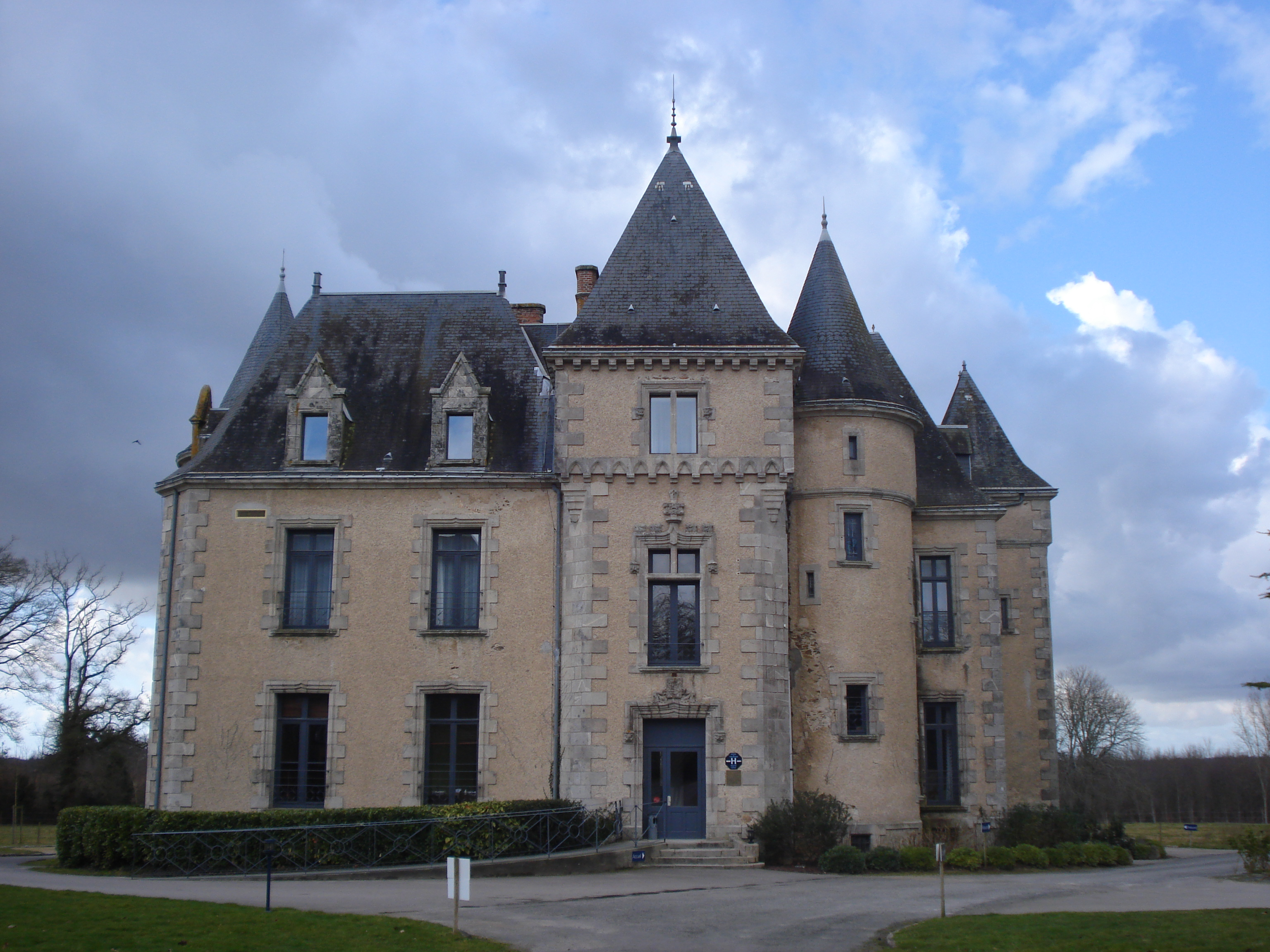
- The Chateau of the Domaine de Brandois

- Coat of arms
- Location of La Mothe-Achard
- Location within France Location within Pays de la Loire
- Coordinates: 46°37′10″N 1°39′28″W
- Country: France
- Region: Pays de la Loire
- Department: Vendée
- Arrondissement: Les Sables-d'Olonne
- Canton: Talmont-Saint-Hilaire
- Commune: Les Achards
- Area^{1}: 8.73 km^{2} (3.37 sq mi)
- Highest elevation: 61 m (200 ft)
- Lowest elevation: 17 m (56 ft)
- Population (2019): 3,165
  - Density: 363/km^{2} (939/sq mi)
- Time zone: UTC+01:00 (CET)
  - Summer (DST): UTC+02:00 (CEST)
- Postal code: 85150
- ^{1} French Land Register data, which excludes lakes, ponds, glaciers > 1 km^{2} (0.386 sq mi or 247 acres) and river estuaries.

La Mothe-Achard (French pronunciation: [la mɔt aʃaʁ]) is a former commune in the Vendée department in the Pays de la Loire region in western France. On 1 January 2017, it was merged into the new commune Les Achards.

== See also ==
- Communes of the Vendée department
