= Les Achards =

- Commune
- Location of Les Achards
- Location within France Location within Pays de la Loire
- Coordinates: 46°37′08″N 1°39′29″W
- Country: France
- Region: Pays de la Loire
- Department: Vendée
- Arrondissement: Les Sables-d'Olonne
- Canton: Talmont-Saint-Hilaire
- Intercommunality: Pays-des-Achards

Government
  - Mayor (2026–32): Sylvain Moniot-Beaumont
- Area^{1}: 30.30 km^{2} (11.70 sq mi)
- Population (2023): 5,518
  - Density: 182.1/km^{2} (471.7/sq mi)
- Time zone: UTC+01:00 (CET)
  - Summer (DST): UTC+02:00 (CEST)
- INSEE/Postal code: 85152 /85150
- ^{1} French Land Register data, which excludes lakes, ponds, glaciers > 1 km^{2} (0.386 sq mi or 247 acres) and river estuaries.

Les Achards (French pronunciation: [le.z‿aʃaʁ]) is a commune in the department of Vendée, western France. The municipality was established on 1 January 2017 by merger of the former communes of La Mothe-Achard (the seat) and La Chapelle-Achard.

== Geography ==
=== Climate ===
Les Achards has an oceanic climate (Köppen climate classification Cfb). The average annual temperature in Les Achards is 12.8 °C (55.0 °F). The average annual rainfall is 959.1 mm (37.76 in) with November as the wettest month. The temperatures are highest on average in August, at around 19.7 °C (67.5 °F), and lowest in January, at around 6.6 °C (43.9 °F). The highest temperature ever recorded in Les Achards was 41.2 °C (106.2 °F) on 12 July 1949; the coldest temperature ever recorded was −13.2 °C (8.2 °F) on 16 January 1985.

Climate data for Les Achards (La Mothe-Achard, 1991−2020 normals, extremes 1942−present)
| Month | Jan | Feb | Mar | Apr | May | Jun | Jul | Aug | Sep | Oct | Nov | Dec | Year |
|---|---|---|---|---|---|---|---|---|---|---|---|---|---|
| Record high °C (°F) | 16.1 (61.0) | 21.1 (70.0) | 25.1 (77.2) | 28.5 (83.3) | 34.8 (94.6) | 39.8 (103.6) | 41.2 (106.2) | 39.6 (103.3) | 34.8 (94.6) | 29.3 (84.7) | 21.3 (70.3) | 17.7 (63.9) | 41.2 (106.2) |
| Mean daily maximum °C (°F) | 9.4 (48.9) | 10.4 (50.7) | 13.3 (55.9) | 15.8 (60.4) | 19.5 (67.1) | 23.0 (73.4) | 25.1 (77.2) | 25.2 (77.4) | 22.4 (72.3) | 17.8 (64.0) | 13.0 (55.4) | 10.1 (50.2) | 17.1 (62.8) |
| Daily mean °C (°F) | 6.6 (43.9) | 6.9 (44.4) | 9.1 (48.4) | 11.2 (52.2) | 14.7 (58.5) | 17.9 (64.2) | 19.6 (67.3) | 19.7 (67.5) | 17.2 (63.0) | 14.0 (57.2) | 9.8 (49.6) | 7.2 (45.0) | 12.8 (55.0) |
| Mean daily minimum °C (°F) | 3.8 (38.8) | 3.4 (38.1) | 5.0 (41.0) | 6.6 (43.9) | 9.9 (49.8) | 12.7 (54.9) | 14.2 (57.6) | 14.2 (57.6) | 11.9 (53.4) | 10.1 (50.2) | 6.6 (43.9) | 4.2 (39.6) | 8.5 (47.3) |
| Record low °C (°F) | −13.2 (8.2) | −12.5 (9.5) | −9.6 (14.7) | −3.5 (25.7) | −2.5 (27.5) | 0.7 (33.3) | 5.0 (41.0) | 5.0 (41.0) | 1.8 (35.2) | −4.0 (24.8) | −7.5 (18.5) | −12.0 (10.4) | −13.2 (8.2) |
| Average precipitation mm (inches) | 105.0 (4.13) | 77.4 (3.05) | 68.8 (2.71) | 71.2 (2.80) | 61.6 (2.43) | 44.5 (1.75) | 50.3 (1.98) | 59.2 (2.33) | 81.8 (3.22) | 106.6 (4.20) | 118.7 (4.67) | 114.0 (4.49) | 959.1 (37.76) |
| Average precipitation days (≥ 1.0 mm) | 13.6 | 11.2 | 10.1 | 10.3 | 9.7 | 7.5 | 7.8 | 7.9 | 8.5 | 12.7 | 13.9 | 14.0 | 127.2 |
Source: Météo-France

== Population ==
Population data refer to the area corresponding with the commune as of January 2025.

Historical population
| Year | Pop. | ±% p.a. |
|---|---|---|
| 1968 | 1,941 | — |
| 1975 | 2,092 | +1.08% |
| 1982 | 2,600 | +3.15% |
| 1990 | 2,778 | +0.83% |
| 1999 | 3,059 | +1.08% |
| 2007 | 3,934 | +3.19% |
| 2012 | 4,683 | +3.55% |
| 2017 | 5,063 | +1.57% |
| 2023 | 5,518 | +1.44% |
Source: INSEE

== See also ==
- Communes of the Vendée department
