= St. Mark's Church, Versailles =

Coordinates: 48.7873°N 2.1514°E

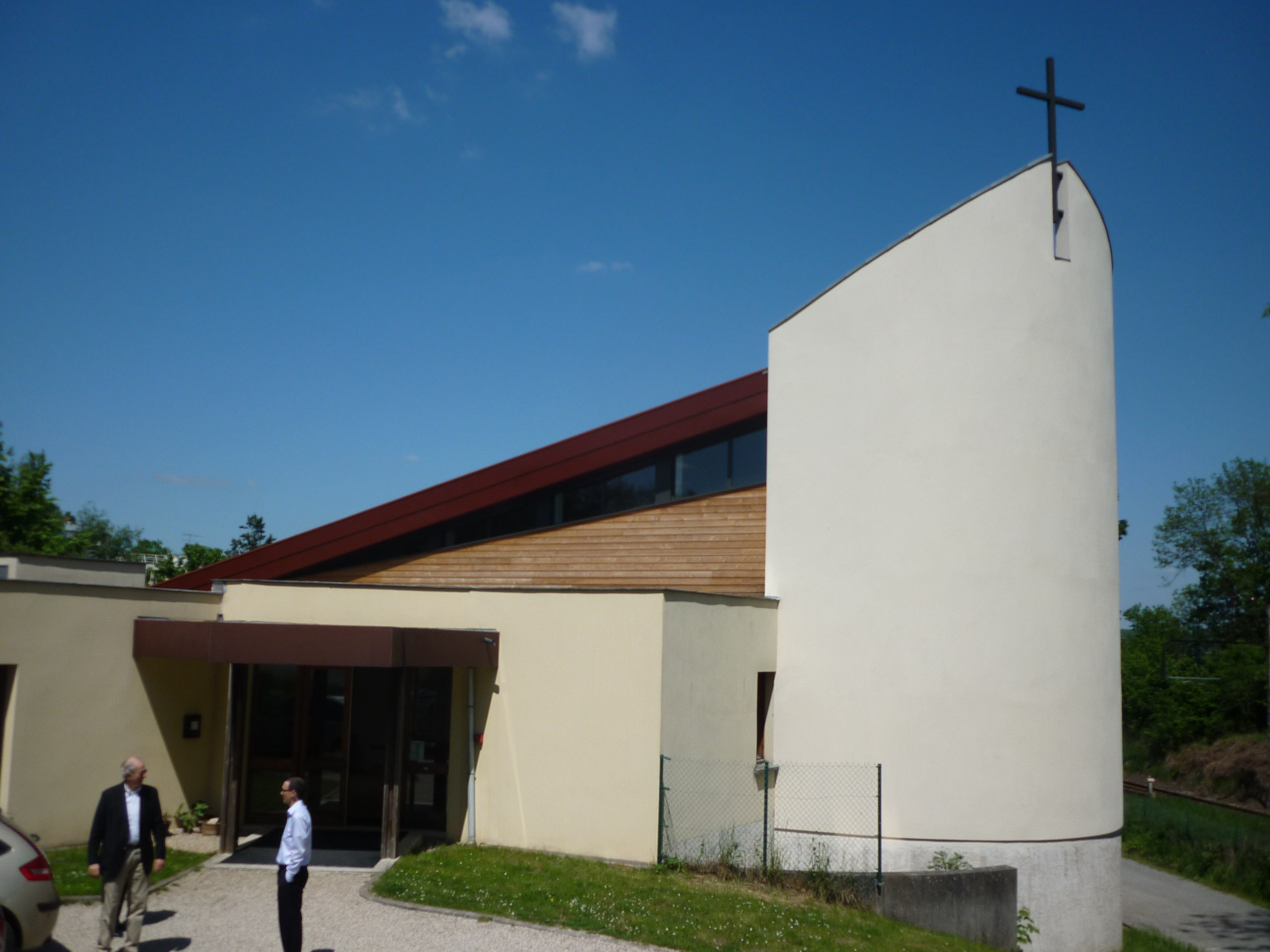
- St Mark's Church, Versailles, built 2012
- St. Mark's Church, Versailles
- Address: 31 rue du Pont Colbert, Versailles
- Country: France
- Denomination: Anglican

History
- Status: Church
- Dedication: Saint Mark
- Dedicated: 16 February 2013 by Bishop David Hamid

Architecture
- Functional status: Active
- Architectural type: Church
- Style: Modernist
- Years built: 1985 – 2012

Administration
- Diocese: Europe
- Archdeaconry: France

St. Mark's Church, Versailles, or St. Mark's, Versailles, is an Anglican church dedicated to Saint Mark in Versailles, France. It is one of the churches of the Diocese of Europe within the Archdeaconry of France. St. Mark's is under the patronage of the Intercontinental Church Society.

== History ==
It is believed that the origin of the Anglican church in Versailles may go back to the purchase of a plot of land in 1710 by the then British Ambassador to the court of Louis XIV. The origin of when and where an English Church came to be in Versailles is difficult to establish. There are notes written by former chaplains that a chapel was built for the British Ambassador to the Court of Louis XIV on land purchased from the Abbe Dubois in 1710. Where this land was in Versailles is not clear, though a reference has been found to the existence of a ‘Chapelle Anglicane ’ at 31, avenue de St Cloud.

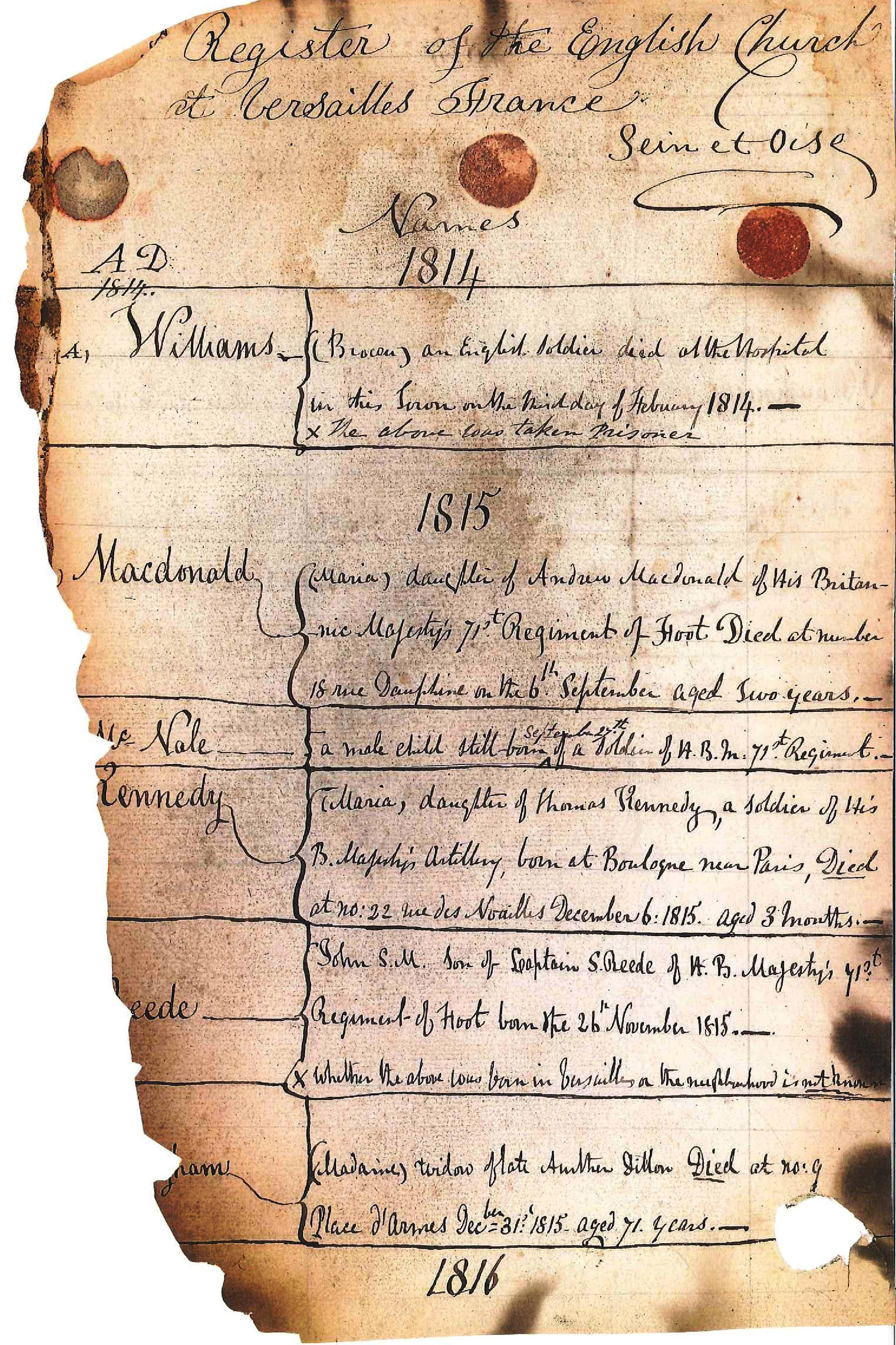
Photo of Church register

The oldest document we have is the Church Register for 1814, which records the death of a British prisoner of war, Brecon Williams, "at midday of the 7th February at the hospital in this town". The entries for 1815 refer to relatives of military personnel, mainly from His Britannic Majesties 71st Regiment of Foot, which became The Highland Light Infantry, and formed part of the ‘army of occupation’ camped near to Versailles after the Battle of Waterloo. This register shows that the church has no name and is referred to both as the ‘English Church at Versailles’ and the ‘British Episcopal Church Versailles – Seine et Oise’.It is not clear how an English Church continued to operate prior to 1815, during the period of the Napoleonic Wars. Perhaps it had diplomatic immunity?

There are no records to show where the church was worshipping but on 24 May 1821 members of the ‘British Colony’ were given permission by the Minister of the Interior, in a letter to the Prefect, to allow the practice of the ‘culte Anglicane’ in an abandoned Royal Oratory. This Oratory (or ‘Reposoir’) had been built by Louis XV in 1769 at the midpoint of the route taken by the ‘processions royales de la Fete Dieu’ from the Church of Notre Dame on the Rue de la Paroisse to the Chateau. It was located at 3 Rue Dauphine (the present day Rue Hoche). During and after the revolution it was used as a communal meeting hall and then as a grain store.

In 1821 the congregation numbered 171 and the Rev. James Beaver was the chaplain at that time, though records show that there were chaplains before this date. In the early years there was no appointed Bishop but in 1825, Bishop Luscombe was appointed to manage some of the Anglican Churches in France including Versailles.

Between 1821 and 1859 the church rented the building in Rue Dauphine, (now the Protestant Église Reformée in rue Hoche) and on Saturday 19 July 1828 it was consecrated by Bishop Luscombe accompanied by five English clergymen from Paris.

In 1828 the French Protestant community asked if they could share the building, as their numbers had grown due to the influx of Protestant workers from Bavaria who were employed in the textile factories at Jouy-en-Josas. This illustrated how the two communities of English and French Protestants shared their assets for the greater good. The French Protestants continue to use this building even today.

This sharing arrangement with the French Protestant community continued until 1859, when The Rev. C.C. Glascott had the opportunity to buy a plot of land on the rue des Bons Enfants, (now called rue du Peintre Lebrun). Formerly, this had formed part of the garden of the Cardinal de Bouillon, who fell out of favour with Louis XIV and had his estates confiscated. The king used the land for his troops and built military manufacturing units on it which included a bakery to supply bread for the Royal Guards. In 1856 the land was given by the state to M et Mme Touchard in exchange for other properties. They then sold it in 1859 to Rev. Glascott for 12,000 Frs who, in 1860, at his own expense built a church of iron and wood at a total cost of £581.17s.10d. All the building materials were bought in England and shipped to France on the merchant ship ‘Panther’.

In 1875, he left Versailles and on 4 May 1876 he sold the building and the land to The Colonial and Continental Church Society for 18,000 Frs. This started an association with this Society, which in turn became The Commonwealth and Continental Church Society and latterly The Intercontinental Church Society (ICS) and they remain our Patron to this day. It is around this time that the church is being referred to as ‘St Mark’s.’

The registers from this period contain some interesting remarks and facts. In 1879 the Chaplain is reminding visitors that ... ‘as there is no endowment on this church, the repairs and maintenance of the church and its Services depend entirely on seat rents and the offerings of the congregation. They are therefore invited to apply to the chaplain for sittings and to contribute liberally to the offertory.’ (and if the seats were too hard, cushions could be rented for 5 frs a quarter). The attendance figures show that this small church was well attended with numbers ranging from 90 to 130 on normal Sundays, rising to over 150 on Feast Days such as Easter. Around this time two or three services were held each Sunday, at 9.00 am, 11.00 am and 4.00 pm and during Easter week in 1879 each day at 11.00 am.

A surprising statistic is that less than thirty five percent of the worshipers took communion. (Was this due to mixed catholic/Protestant marriages?). Another interesting fact is that during the ten years after Rev Glascott's departure St Mark's had no fewer than eight different chaplains and at least ten ‘officiating ministers’ who acted as replacement chaplains.

A storm in 1891 appears to have caused serious damage to the building and an architect was called in to assess the structural safety of the church and as a result iron reinforcing bars were installed in 1892. These were designed to correct what had been described as ‘the weak or dangerous side …….as the Church listed that way.’ The assurance was given that these repairs would give protection for at least 10 years! This proved to be true, but 18yrs later in 1910 grave doubts were being expressed again about the state of the building. The iron roof was corroding and leaking, the wooden floor, which had been partially repaired in 1889, was decaying and threatening to ‘subside’ into the cellar. In spite of all these obviously worrying conditions, the church continued to be used and well attended. Then in January 1911, a catastrophic fire completely destroyed the building. The cause of the fire was never established but the collapse of the floor onto the boiler of the heating system was thought to be the most likely culprit.

In September of that year The Rev. Vivian Evans, who was living in Maisons Laffitte, was appointed Chaplain of Versailles and in his report for 1912 says, ‘….. I inherited from my predecessor some insurance money and a heap of embers and twisted iron – I was told to build a church’.‘..….The £863.9s.2d handed over to me from the insurance was totally inadequate ……but you have generously given…….and now we have one of the most beautiful little churches on the Continent’.

It was he who drew up the plans for a new church and his energy and enthusiasm were such that all the money was raised and the church built in less than two years. In reality the church cost approximately £1200 (without furniture) and work started in February 1912 when the site was cleared of debris, the foundation stone was laid on 15 March by The Right Rev. Herbert Bury, Bishop of Fulham and Northern and Central Europe. The completed church was ‘solemnly opened’ on Thursday 21 November 1912 with the celebration of Full Choral Matins followed by Holy Communion and Choral Evensong. It is still there, now occupied by the Church of the Nazarene.

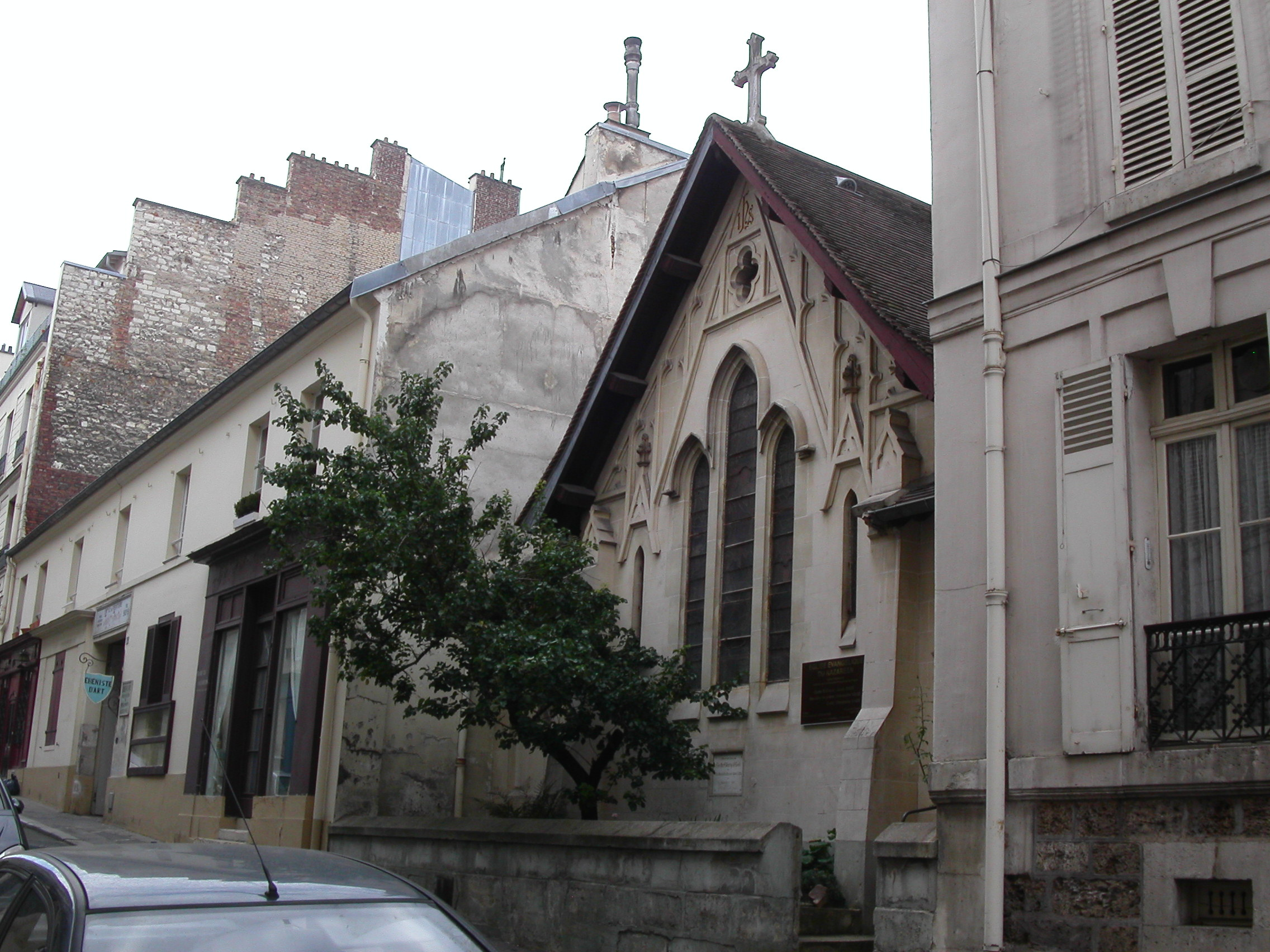
Old St. Mark's Church, rue du Peintre Le Brun (built 1912)

From the time of the chaplain the Rev. G.B. Vivian Evans who rebuilt the church in 1912, St. Mark's was served by a succession of chaplains and the congregation gradually increased. The church registers also report in following years, the sinking of the Titanic; the outbreak of The First World War and in 1917 the memorial service held for 10 British soldiers killed in a train crash at Massy-Palaiseau. ‘The bodies were brought to the church the night before, and sentries of the 32nd Dragoons guarded them till the Service the following day.’ It is reported that the church was too small to accommodate all the mourners.

Just as it did throughout the First World War, St Mark's remained open during this war, but this time without any recorded services. At this point, we should remember Maurice Simpson, who served as Chaplains Warden for over 25 years, and through his devotion kept the church open both during and after the war. Sometimes the congregation consisted only of himself and his daughter.

Services were resumed after the war using Army Chaplains with no doubt the army providing the bulk of the congregation. In 1953, The Rev. H.W. Johnson became the first permanent chaplain appointed after the war. During the subsequent years there were frequent changes of chaplains and sometimes very small congregations

By the 1970s, the tiny St. Mark's could no longer cope with the growing numbers and so by arrangement with the Catholic Bishop of Versailles, the church was given the use of the large chapel at the Lycée de Notre Dame de Grandchamp, Rue Royale, in the Quartier St. Louis in Versailles. The school chapel served the church until the mid-1980s.

In 1985, under the chaplain Jonathan Wilmot, a large plot of land with an old house was purchased at 31 rue du Pont Colbert on the outskirts of Versailles in the quartier of Porchefontaine; the old church building was sold to the Nazarene Church. Initially a small chapel was set up in the stables, while a building plan to provide a church on the site at Pont Colbert was set in motion in stages as funds became available. The first stage, comprising a worship area of 150 seats and two Sunday school rooms, was completed in 1993 under the chaplaincy of David and Angela Marshall. The second stage was completed in 1998 when the foyer, sacristy, counselling room, kitchen and toilets were added, and the whole complex was linked to the office and the chapel in the stable.

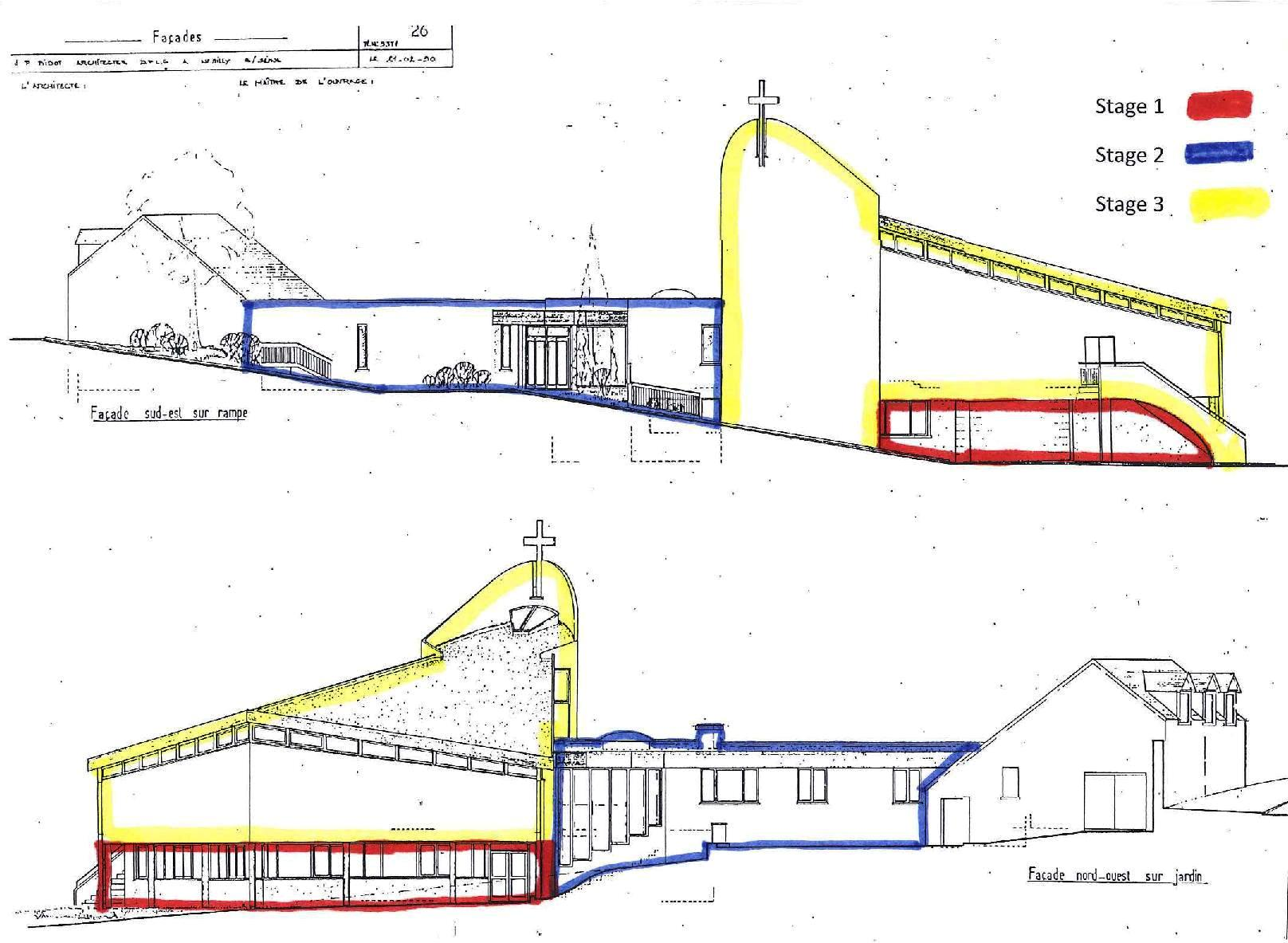
Drawing of Church building

The third stage of the project adding a large room for 250 worshippers, was guided to completion by the chaplain Paul Kenchington. The first service in the partially completed church was actually held on 4 September 2011, when St Mark's said goodbye to the Kenchingtons. After this, Elaine Labourel became the interregnum chaplain for both churches.

During this interregnum, the building project was completed, and was officially opened on 13 May 2012. Rev. Chris Maclay became chaplain in August 2012 and was inducted as the new chaplain on 16 September 2012.

The completed church was dedicated by The Rt. Rev. Bishop David Hamid, Suffragan Bishop in Europe on 16 February 2013, and the 200 years of the Anglican presence in Versailles was celebrated by The Rt. Rev. Robert Innes, Bishop of Gibraltar in Europe on 16 November 2014.

== 19th-century Chaplains ==
Year(s)	Name(s)
1814	C.Waller
1818	B. Sullivan
1819-20	C. Waller
1821-24	J. Beaver
1825-27	Robert Morrit
1827-28	John Caldwell
1828-29	Wm Cowling
1829-31	Officiating Ministers
1832-34	S. Brereton
1835	Chas Murray
1836-37	Dr. W. Thomas
1837-41	Dr. Halfhead
1841-43	Dr. Hale
1844	C. I. Furlong
1845-48	W. Roche
1848-51	Dr. Hale
1851-56	I. P. D. Alley
1856-75	C. C. Glascott
1875	E. L. Puxley
1875-76	Jas Godley
1876-79	Francis Stewart
1879	T. Spaight
1879-80	R. Hempshill
1880-81	J. H. Tait
1881-83	E. Sweny
1813-84	C. I. Hort
1884-93	John Peck
1893-94	John Ord
1894-95	D. Suffling

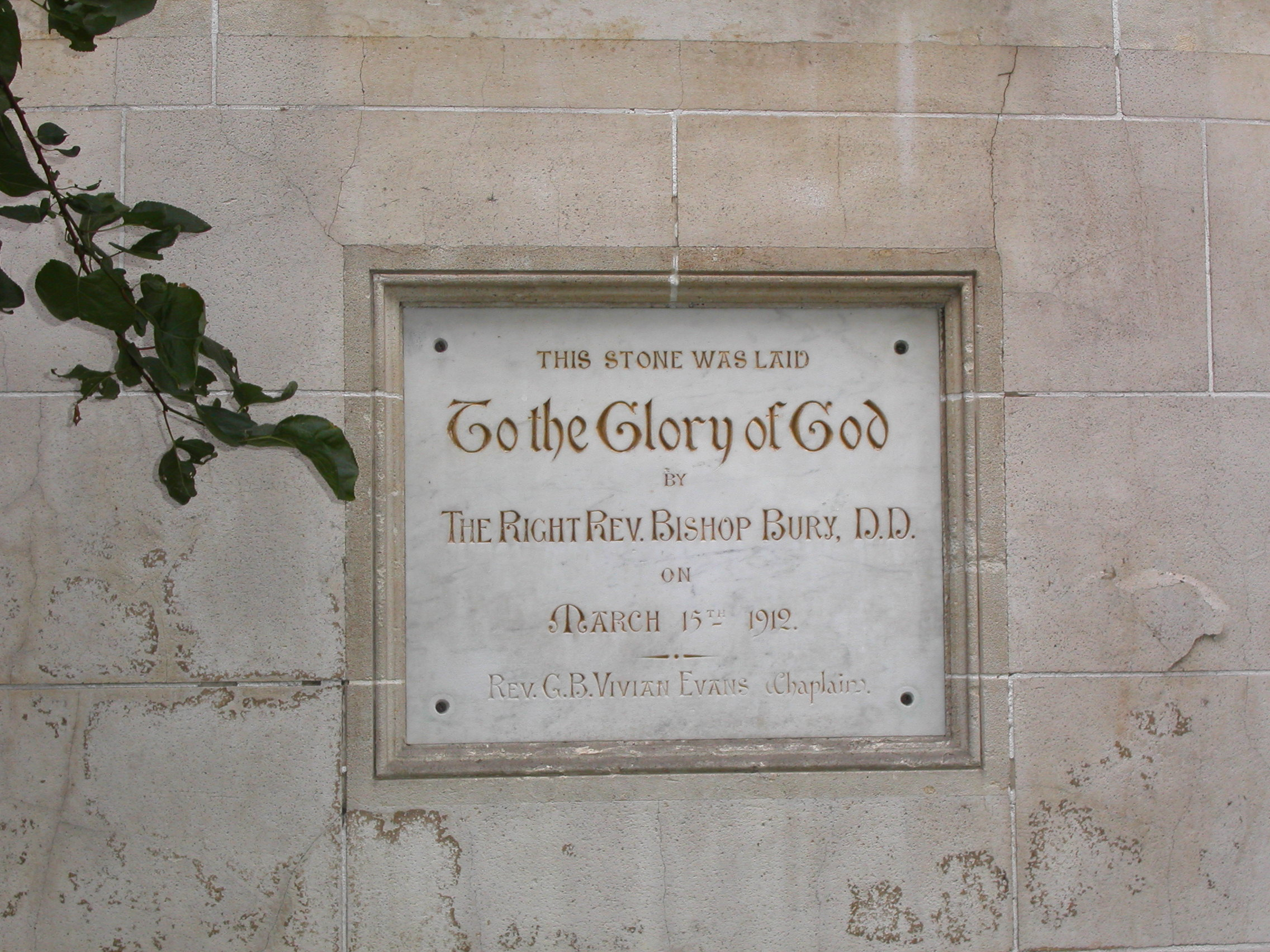
Old St Marks Church, Foundation Stone

== 20th and 21st-century Chaplains ==
Year(s)	Name(s)
1895–1911	W. Browne, J. Harrison, M. Sullivan
1912–1924	G. B. Vivian Evans
1925	W. W. Peyton
1926–1929	W. H. Earp
1930	T. P. Williams
1931–1938	P. Newbery
1938–1939	M. Harvey
1939–1944	2nd World War
1944–1946	Army Chaplains
1946–1951	M. Fletcher
1951–1953	SHAPE chaplains and locums
1953–1954	H. W. Johnson
1954–1955	P. Gamble
1956–1957	Canon Harland
1957–1962	G. E. McNeil
1962–1967	J. R. Maugham
1968–1974	Ph Walton
1974–1977	Canon Alan Lindsay
1977–1982	David Vail
1982–1988	Jonathan Wilmot
1988–1992	Martin Oram
1992–2004	David & Angela Marshall
2005-2011	Paul Kenchington
2012-2015	Chris Maclay
2016	Ajit John
2018-2023	Dale Hanson

== Sources and external links ==
- St.Mark's Church Website
- ICS official website: St. Mark's, Versailles
- Google Maps
- Archives Departementales
