= St. Boniface Church, Antwerp =

Anglican church in Antwerp, Belgium

Coordinates: 51°12′09″N 4°25′02″E

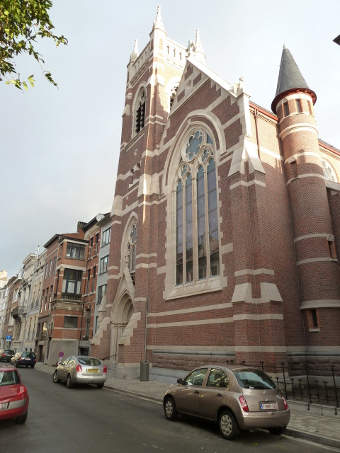
St Boniface Anglican Church

Saint Boniface Church is an Anglican church in Antwerp. It falls within the Archdeaconry of North-West Europe, which itself is part of the 44th diocese of the Church of England, the Diocese in Europe.

The English Church in Antwerp has roots going back to the 16th century, deep into the history of both Antwerp and Anglicanism.

The current church was consecrated on 22 April 1910. From 1821 to 1910, Anglican services in Antwerp were held at the Chapelle des Tanneurs, from the French name for the street it was located on, Huidevettersstraat (roughly Tanners Street), which connects with the west end of Meir in central Antwerp.

It was extensively refurbished in 2010, with support from the Flanders government.
