= Christ Church, Lille =

Church in Hauts-de-France, France

Coordinates: 50.6302°N 3.0662°E

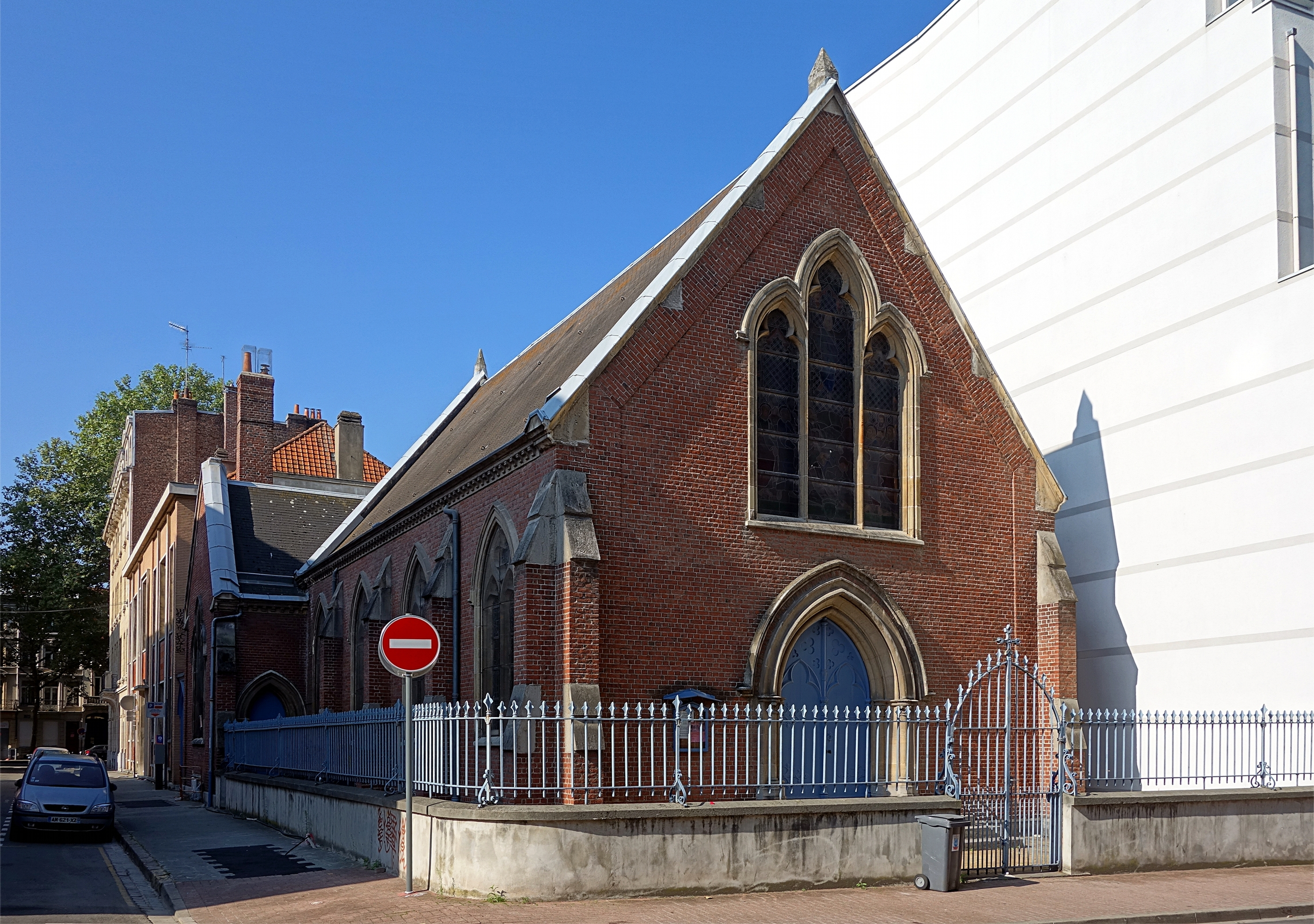
Christ Church in Lille

Christ Church Lille is an English-speaking Anglican Church located in the city of Lille in Nord-Pas-de-Calais, the Flemish area of France. Christ Church Lille is part of the Church of England, Diocese in Europe.

== Location ==
The church, on Rue Lydéric, is within walking distance of Gare de Lille Flandres, Gare de Lille Europe and the city centre as well as tourist attractions such as the Palais des Beaux-Arts de Lille.
