= La Chapelle-Achard =

- Part of Les Achards
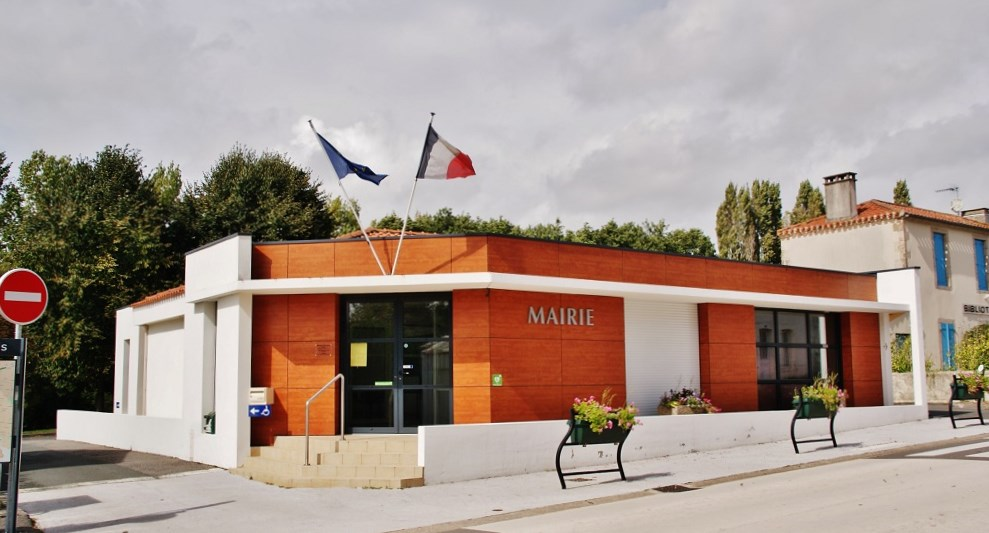
- La Chapelle-Achard Town hall
- Location of La Chapelle-Achard
- Location within France Location within Pays de la Loire
- Coordinates: 46°35′25″N 1°38′45″W
- Country: France
- Region: Pays de la Loire
- Department: Vendée
- Arrondissement: Les Sables-d'Olonne
- Canton: Talmont-Saint-Hilaire
- Commune: Les Achards
- Area^{1}: 21.57 km^{2} (8.33 sq mi)
- Highest elevation: 58 m (190 ft)
- Lowest elevation: 7 m (23 ft)
- Population (2019): 2,106
  - Density: 97.64/km^{2} (252.9/sq mi)
- Time zone: UTC+01:00 (CET)
  - Summer (DST): UTC+02:00 (CEST)
- Postal code: 85150
- ^{1} French Land Register data, which excludes lakes, ponds, glaciers > 1 km^{2} (0.386 sq mi or 247 acres) and river estuaries.

La Chapelle-Achard (French pronunciation: [la ʃapɛl aʃaʁ]) is a former commune in the Vendée department in the Pays de la Loire region in western France. On 1 January 2017, it was merged into the new commune Les Achards.

== See also ==
- Communes of the Vendée department
