= Matthew Luscombe =

Scottish Anglican bishop

Matthew Henry Thornhill Luscombe (1776–1846) was a Scottish Anglican bishop in Europe.

== Life ==
He was the son of Samuel Luscombe, physician at Exeter, and his wife Jane. He was educated at Exeter grammar school and at Catharine Hall, Cambridge, where he graduated B.A. 1798 and M.A. 1805. He was curate at Clewer, Windsor, and from 1806 to 1819 was master of the East India Company College at Hertford Heath, holding also the curacy of St. Andrew's, Hertford. Walter Farquhar Hook was one of his pupils there, and became an intimate friend. On 20 January 1810 he was incorporated M.A. of Oxford, joining Exeter College and proceeding B.C.L. 1 February 1810, and D.C.L. two days later. In 1819 he moved to Caen, and subsequently to Paris.

In 1824, George Canning decided to appoint Luscombe embassy chaplain in Paris, and also general superintendent at the same time of the Anglican congregations on the continent. But he shortly afterwards assented to a proposal made by Hook, that the bishops of the Scottish Episcopal Church should consecrate Luscombe to a continental bishopric; and so on 20 March 1825 Luscombe was consecrated at Stirling. In the course of the same year he assumed the office of chaplain at Paris, a post he retained until his death. Instead of the room at the embassy or the French Protestant Oratoire in which services had been held, he erected in 1834, mostly at his own cost, a church in the Rue d'Aguesseau. He officiated at William Makepeace Thackeray's marriage in Paris in 1836.

Luscombe died suddenly of heart disease at Lausanne, 24 August 1846, and was buried at La Sallaz cemetery. On June 30 1804, at St. George's, Hanover Square, he had married Susannah Dawes, the daughter of Henry Harwood, commissioner of the navy, by whom he had a son (who predeceased him) and two daughters. He left a bequest for divinity scholarships at Glenalmond College, Perthshire.

== Works ==
Luscombe held high-church principles. He was one of the founders in 1841 of the Christian Remembrancer. He published:

- Sermon on Adultery, London 1801.
- Sermons from the French (translations), 1825.
- The Church of Rome compared with the Bible, the Fathers of the Church, and the Church of England, 1839. This was translated into French, and a reply appeared in 1842 by Alessandro Zeloni: Concordance des Écritures, des Pères et des conciles des cinq premiers siècles avec la doctrine de l'Église catholique romaine, ou Réponse à l'ouvrage de M. Luscomb, évêque anglican.
- Pleasures of Society, a poem (anon.)
