= Christ Church Lausanne =

Church in Lausanne, Switzerland

Coordinates: 46.5143817°N 6.6279157°E

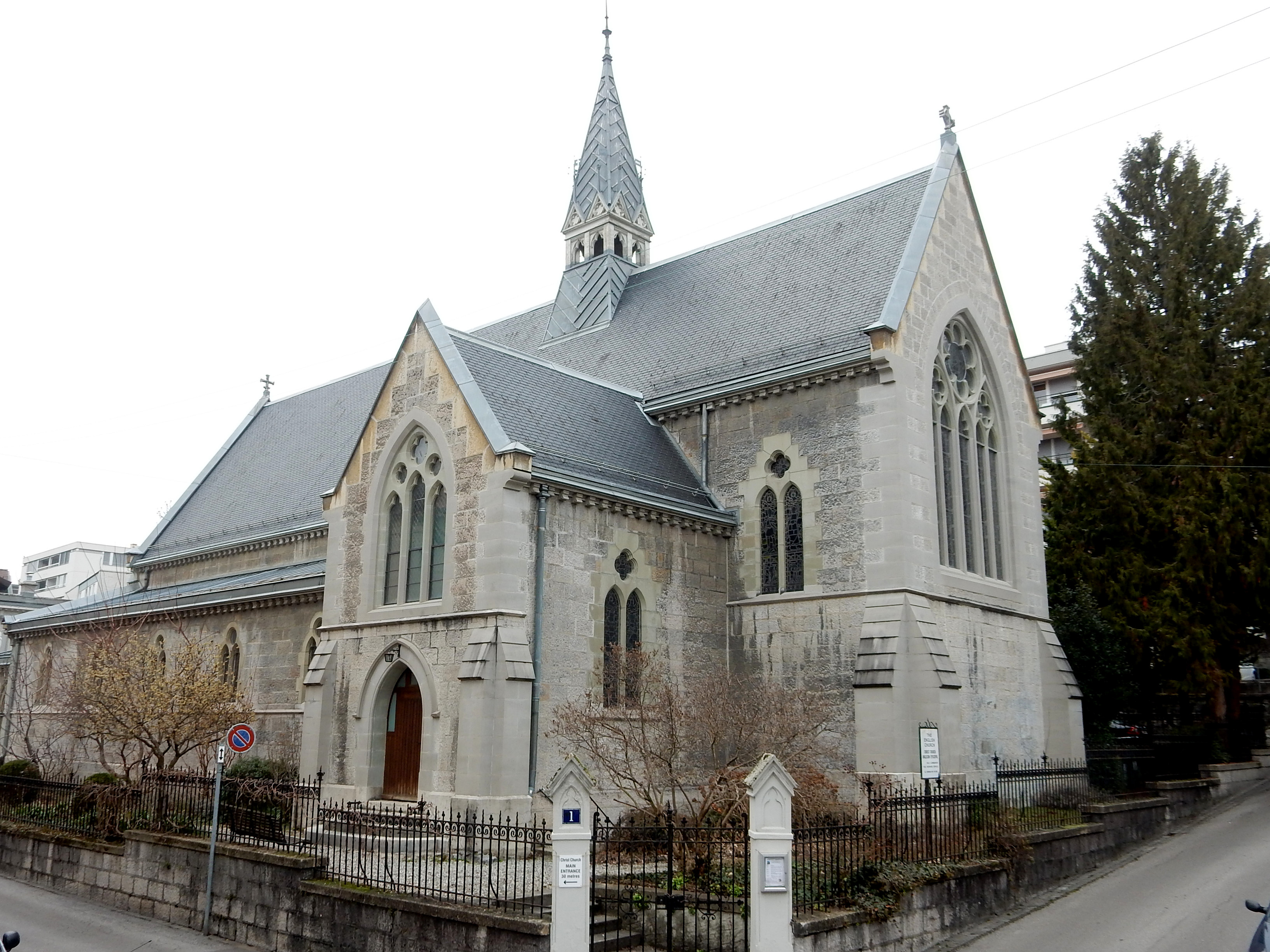
Christ Church in Lausanne, 2015

Christ Church Lausanne is an Anglican Episcopal church in Lausanne, Switzerland. Services are held in English every Sunday.

The Anglican community was established in Lausanne in 1816. Its church building — located on Avenue de l'Eglise-Anglaise (English Church Avenue) — was finished in 1878. The church is one of three 19th century Anglican chapels designed by English Gothic architect G.E. Street, along with All Saints, Vevey (1882) and a third church in Mürren.
