= Religion in Portugal =

Religion in Portugal (2021 census)
1. Catholicism (80.2%)
2. Protestantism (2.13%)
3. Jehovah's Witnesses (0.72%)
4. Eastern Orthodoxy (0.69%)
5. Other Christians (1.04%)
6. No religion (14.1%)
7. Islam (0.42%)
8. Hinduism (0.22%)
9. Buddhism (0.19%)
10. Judaism (0.03%)
11. Other religions (0.28%)

Church of the Holy Cross in Coimbra.

Christianity is the predominant religion in Portugal, with Roman Catholicism being its largest denomination; according to the 2021 census, 84.77% of the total population is Christian. Currently, Portugal is a secular state and its constitution guarantees freedom of religion.

== Overview ==
According to the 2021 census, 80.2% of the population of Portugal is Catholic, though in 2001 only about 19% attended Mass and took the sacraments regularly, while a larger number wish to have their children baptized, be married in a church, and receive Last Rites.

Portugal is one of the most religious countries in Europe, most Portuguese believe with certainty in the existence of God and religion is important in their lives. According to the Pew Research Center Portugal is the 9th most religious country out of 34 European countries, 40% of Portuguese Catholics pray daily, and 36% say religion is very important in their lives.

Although church and state are formally separated since 1911, the Catholic precepts continue to have a significant bearing in Portuguese society and culture. The educational and health care systems were for a long time the Church's preserve, and in many cases, whenever a building, bridge, or highway was opened, it received a blessing from the clergy. The Catholic Church in Portugal is also afforded certain preferential rights and privileges in the country's law.

== Demographics ==
According to the 2021 census, 80.2% of the population aged 15 and older is Catholic, a figure very similar to that recorded in the 2011 census, when 81.0% selected Catholicism as their religion. About 5% adhere to other forms of Christianity, with 2.1% being Protestant, 0.7% Jehovah's Witnesses, 0.7% Orthodox, and 1% members of other Christian churches. Just over 1% indicated belonging to non-Christian religions, with 0.4% being Muslim, 0.2% Hindu, 0.2% Buddhist and 0.3% members of other religions. 14% indicated not having any religion.

Religion in Portugal - 2021 census
Religion	Number	Percent
Christianity	7,444,786	84.77%
Catholicism	7,043,016	80.20%
Protestantism	186,832	2.13%
Jehovah's Witnesses	63,609	0.72%
Orthodoxy	60,381	0.69%
Other Christian	90,948	1.04%
Non-Christian religions	99,984	1.14%
Islam	36,480	0.42%
Hinduism	19,471	0.22%
Buddhism	16,757	0.19%
Judaism	2,910	0.03%
Other non-Christian	24,366	0.28%
No religion	1,237,130	14.09%
Note: Question asked to the population aged 15 and older

Census data show some regional differences. Catholicism is strongest in the Azores (91.6%), Madeira (90.9%) and the North region (88.1%). On the other hand, the Setúbal Peninsula (65.3%) and the Algarve (65.9%) have the lowest percentages. It is in the Setúbal Peninsula, the Greater Lisbon and the Algarve that the highest proportions of members of other Christian churches, of other religions and of people without religious affiliation are found. Members of other Christian religions make up more than 10% of the Algarve's population. In the Greater Lisbon and in the Algarve more than 2% of the population follow non-Christian religions and the percentage of the non-religious population varies between around 6% in the Azores and Madeira and 25.6% in the Setúbal Peninsula.

Religion in Portugal, by region - Census 2021
Region	Total	Christianity		Catholicism		Other Christian		Non-Christian religions		No religion	
Region	Total	Number	Percent	Number	Percent	Number	Percent	Number	Percent	Number	Percent
North	3,080,860	2,800,199	90.9%	2,713,422	88.1%	86,777	2.8%	13,901	0.5%	266,760	8.7%
Central	1,423,683	1,279,951	89.9%	1,231,231	86.4%	48,720	3.5%	7,708	0.5%	136,024	9.6%
West and Tagus Valley	689,934	587,923	85.2%	552,908	80.1%	35,015	5.1%	6,470	0.9%	95,541	13.8%
Greater Lisbon	1,719,646	1,293,834	75.2%	1,176,264	68.4%	117,570	6.8%	45,350	2.6%	380,462	22.1%
Setúbal Peninsula	671,313	488,905	72.8%	438,668	65.3%	50,237	7.5%	10,709	1.6%	171,699	25.6%
Alentejo	395,346	312,510	79.0%	298,525	75.5%	13,985	3.5%	6,533	1.7%	76,303	19.3%
Algarve	390,103	297,366	76.2%	257,046	65.9%	40,320	10.3%	7,951	2.0%	84,786	21.7%
Azores	195,788	183,186	93.6%	179,395	91.6%	3,791	1.9%	521	0.3%	12,081	6.2%
Madeira	215,227	200,912	93.3%	195,557	90.9%	5,355	2.5%	841	0.4%	13,474	6.3%
Note: Question asked to the population aged 15 and older

Religion by municipality - 2021 Census

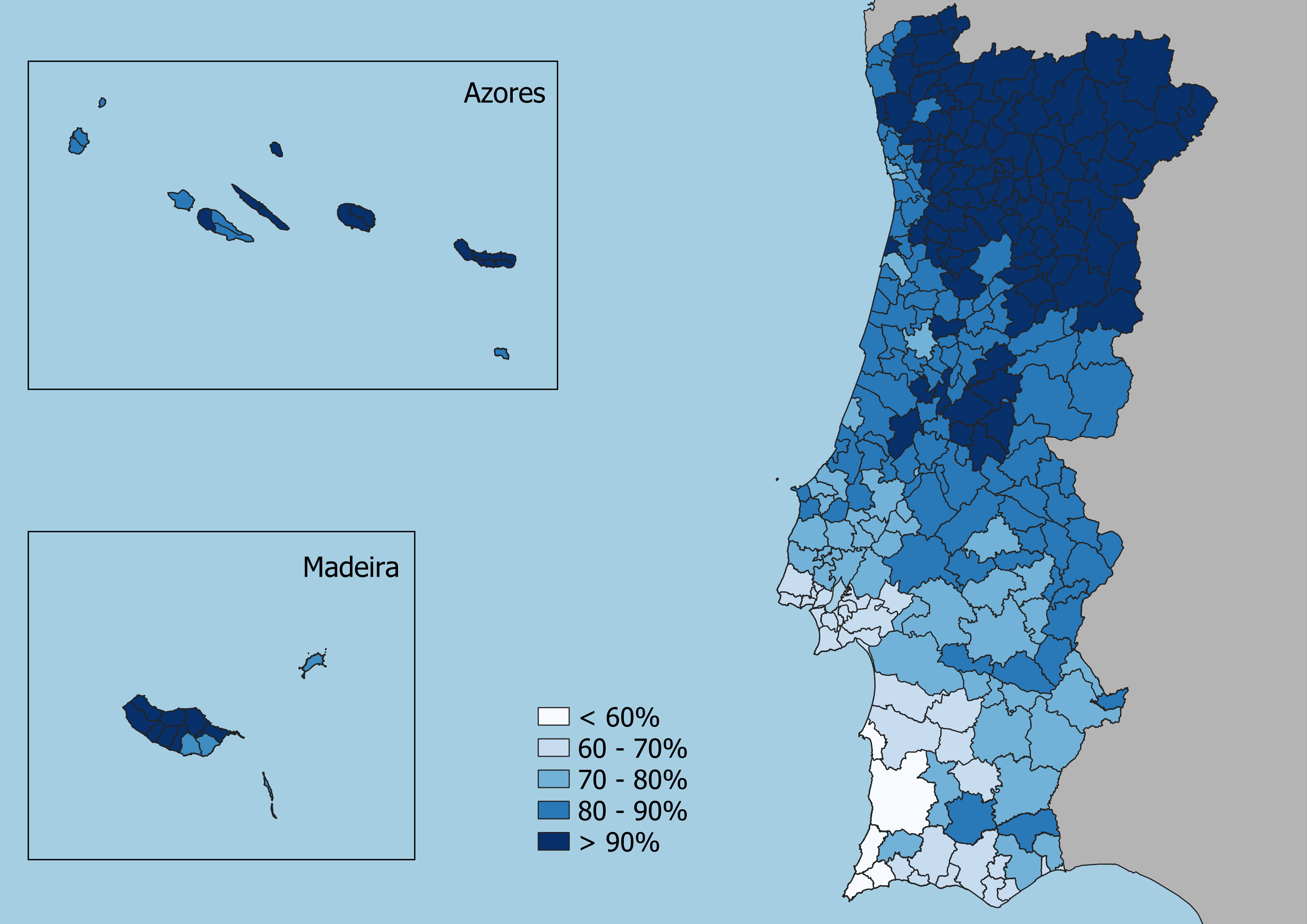
Percentage of Catholics by municipality

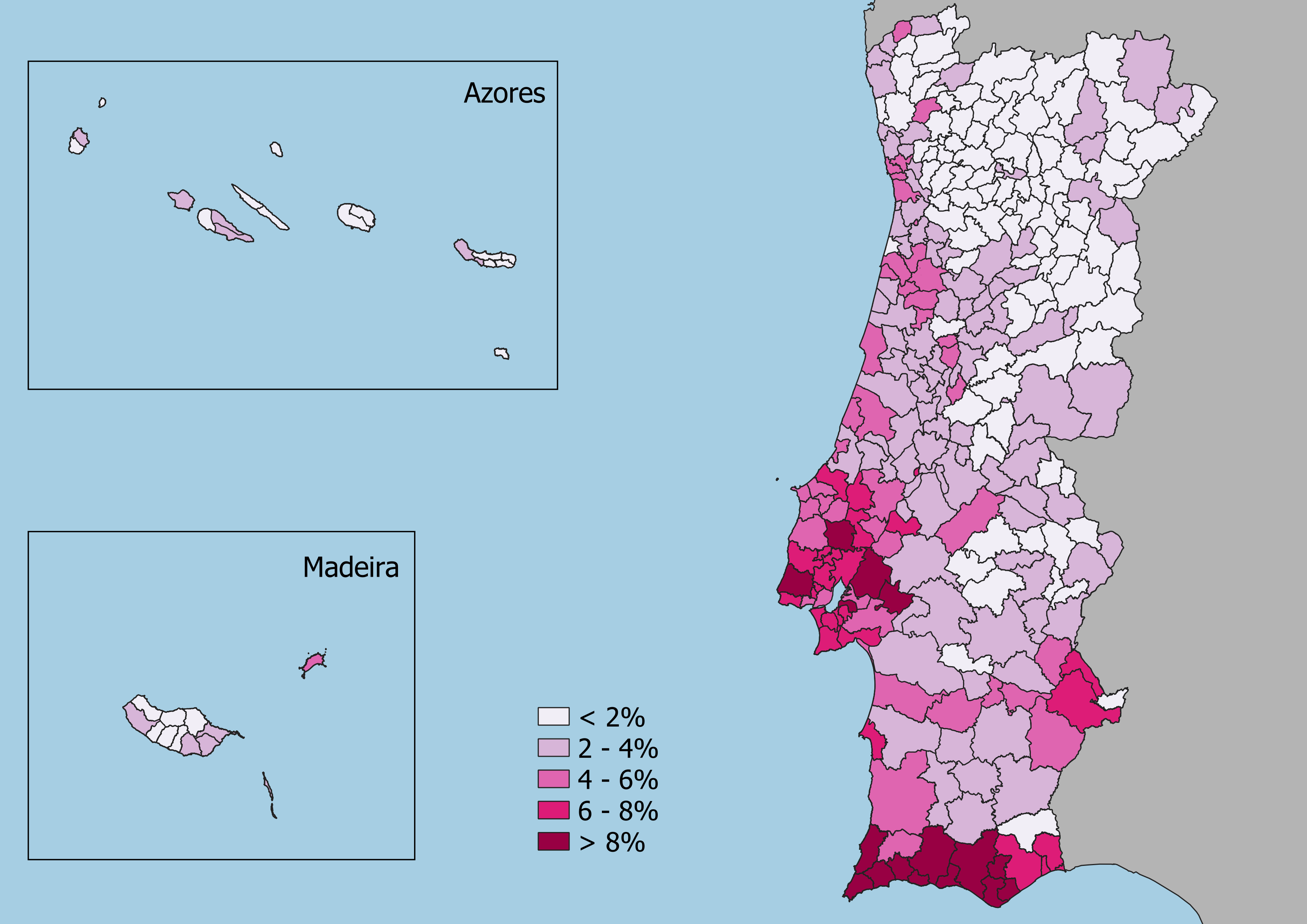
Percentage of members of other Christian denominations by municipality

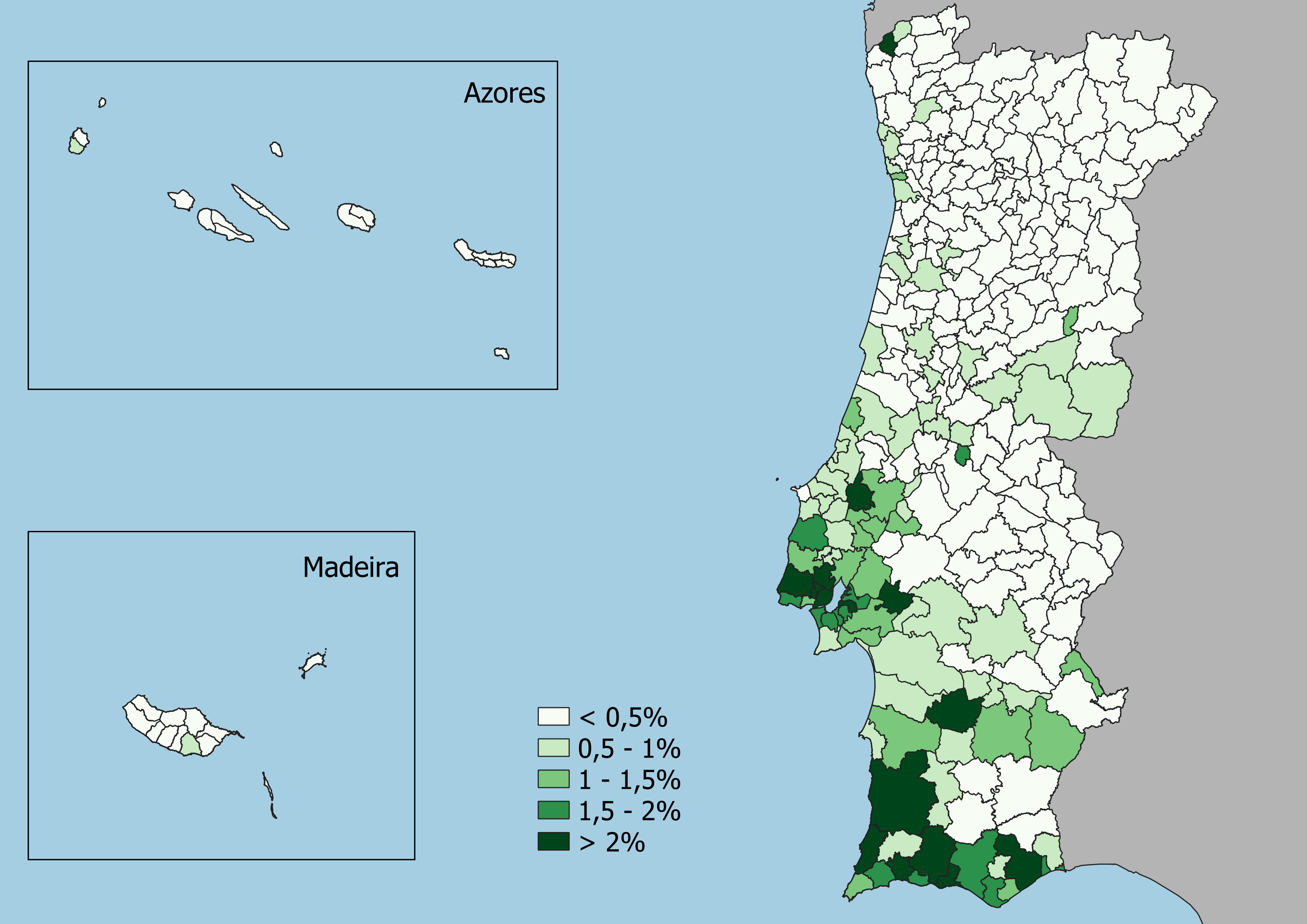
Percentage of members of other religions by municipality

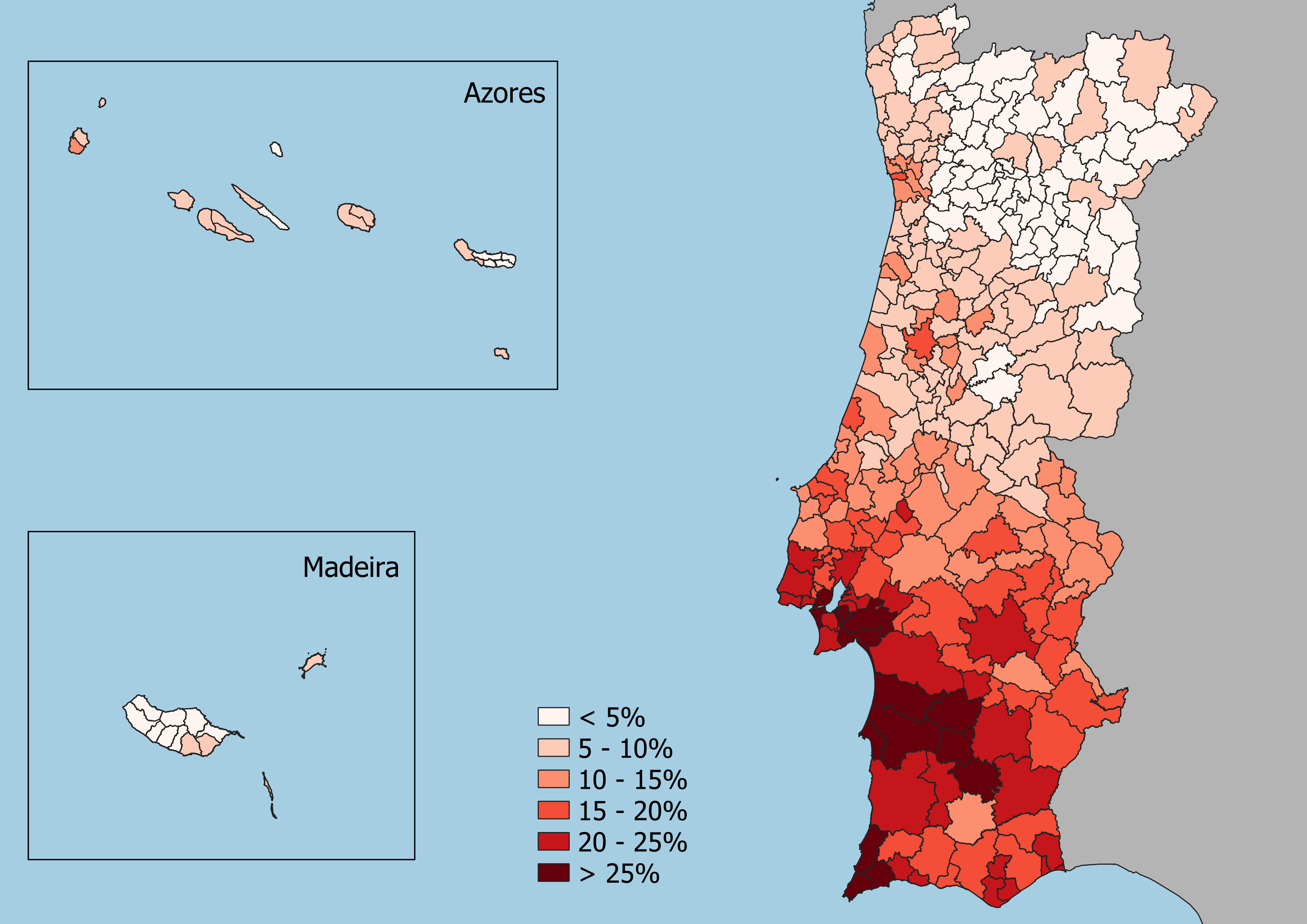
Percentage of non-religious by municipality

In 124 of the 308 municipalities, over 90% of the population indicated being Catholic in the 2021 Census. The municipalities with the highest percentages are Mesão Frio (97.0%), Ribeira de Pena (96.5%), Resende (96.4%) and Baião (96.3%) in the North region, and Vila Franca do Campo (96.3%) in the Azores. The least Catholic municipalities are located in the Algarve and on the Alentejo coast with Lagos (55.2%), Vila do Bispo (56.1%), Sines (56.2%), Aljezur (56.3%) and Odemira (56.7%) with the lowest percentages . The municipalities with the highest proportions of members of other Christian denominations are Lagos (14.3%), Albufeira (13.2%), Portimão (12.7%), Loulé (11.3%) and São Brás de Alportel (11.0%), all in the Algarve. The municipalities with the highest proportion of followers of non-Christian religions are Odemira (16.5%), Albufeira (4.1%), Lisbon (3.9%), Odivelas (3.4%) and Amadora (3.2%), in the Alentejo, Algarve and Greater Lisbon regions. With regard to the non-religious population, the highest percentages are registered in parts of the Alentejo and the Algarve with Sines (35.5%), Vila do Bispo (33.7%), Grândola (31.7%), Aljezur (31.5%) and Aljustrel (31.4%) recording the highest percentages. In 15 municipalities more than a quarter of the population is not religious. On the other hand, in 74 municipalities this percentage is less than 5%.

There is a very considerable difference in terms of religious composition between the inhabitants with Portuguese nationality and the foreign population residing in the country, which makes up 5.2% of the total population. 82.6% of residents of Portuguese nationality are Catholic, while only 36.4% of foreigners identify with the Catholic Church. Just over 3% of Portuguese nationals belong to other Christian denominations, a percentage that approaches 30% among foreign residents. Only 0.6% of residents of Portuguese nationality reported belonging to non-Christian religions, with this percentage being 12.3% among foreigners. As for the population without religious affiliation, the percentage is 13.7% among residents born in Portugal and 21.5% among residents born abroad.

Statistics Portugal made available, in November 2023, an anonymized microdata file for public use with a sample of 5% of the responses to the 2021 Census. The question on religion had a very high response rate, of 97.5%.These data show that the percentage of Catholics is higher among women (83.1%) than men (76.8%). On the other hand, the percentage of unaffiliated it is higher among men (17.8%) than women (10.9%). There are no relevant differences between genders regarding the affiliation to other Christian denominations and to non-Christian religions.

Religion	Male	Female
Catholicism	76.8%	83.1%
Other Christian	4.0%	5.1%
Non-Christian religions	1.4%	0.9%
No religion	17.8%	10.9%

The same microdata file shows that older generations are more religious. The percentage of Catholics varies between 66.9% among the population aged 25–34 and 91.7% among those over 75 years old. It is among younger people that the highest percentages of members of other Christian churches and other religions are found.

Religion	15-24	25-34	35-44	45-54	55-64	65-74	75+
Catholicism	70.9%	66.9%	74.4%	81.0%	85.4%	88.3%	91.7%
Other Christian	5.2%	6.2%	6.2%	4.9%	3.9%	3.2%	2.6%
Non-Christian religions	1.3%	2.9%	1.9%	1.0%	0.5%	0.4%	0.2%
No religion	22.5%	24.1%	17.5%	13.2%	10.2%	8.0%	5.5%

The sample of responses to the Census shows that it is among the population with basic levels of education (1st, 2nd and 3rd cycles of education) that the highest percentage of Catholics is found (86.6%). On the other hand, the lowest percentage of members of the Catholic Church is found among residents with post-secondary education (68.2%). It is at this level of education that the highest percentage of adherents of other Christian churches is found (8.6%). Regarding the unaffiliated, the biggest percentage is found among the population with higher levels of education (23.0%).

Religion	No formal education	Basic education	Upper secondary	Post secondary	Higher education
Catholicism	83.5%	86.6%	73.5%	68.2%	71.6%
Other Christian	5.9%	3.7%	6.4%	8.6%	4.1%
Non-Christian religions	2.3%	0.7%	1.6%	1.3%	1.3%
No religion	8.3%	9.0%	18.4%	21.9%	23.0%

Catholicism is strongest in the rural areas of the country, where 87.0% of residents claimed to belong to this denomination. In urban areas, the percentage of Catholics is 75.9%. In the urban areas there are higher percentages of members of other Christian denominations, of other religions and non-religious people.

Religion	Rural areas	Urban areas
Catholicism	87.0%	75.9%
Other Christian	2.9%	5.6%
Non-Christian religions	0.6%	1.5%
No religion	9.5%	16.9%

== History ==
18th century organs and ceiling inside Braga Cathedral

As in most provinces of the Roman Empire, the religious beliefs and deities of the Pre-Roman populations mingled and coexisted with Roman mythology. In the Portuguese case, those Pre-Roman religions were basically Proto-Celtic or Celtic, chief amongst them that of the Lusitanians (see Lusitanian mythology).

Sephardi Jewish populations have existed in the area going back to the Roman era or even before that.

The Roman Provinces of Lusitania (comprising most of Portugal south of the Douro river) and of Gallaecia (north of the Douro river) were first Christianized while part of the Roman Empire. During this period, Bracara Augusta (the modern city of Braga) became one of the most important episcopal centres, alongside Santiago de Compostela. Christianity was solidified when the Suevi and the Visigoths—Germanic tribes already Christianized—came into the Iberian Peninsula in the fifth century.

Early Visigoths followed the Arian heresy, but they joined Roman mainstream after the eighth century. The city of Braga played an important role in the religious history of the period, namely during the renunciation of the Arian and Priscillianist heresies. Two synods were held in Braga in the sixth century, marking the origin of its ecclesiastical significance. The Archbishops of Braga retains the title of Primate of Portugal, and long claimed supremacy over the whole of the churches of Hispania.

Braga had an important role in the Christianization of the whole Iberian Peninsula. The first known bishop of Braga, Paternus, lived during the end of the fourth century, although Saint Ovidius (d. 135 AD) is sometimes considered one of the first bishops of this city. In the early fifth century, Paulus Orosius, a friend of Saint Augustine, born in Braga, wrote several theological and historical works of great importance. In the sixth century, another influential figure was Saint Martin of Braga, a bishop of Braga who converted the Suevi from Arianism to Catholicism. He also founded an important monastery near Braga, in Dumio (Dume), now an archaeological site. Several Ecumenical Councils were held in Braga during this period, a sign of the religious importance of the city.

Christianity saw its importance diminish in southern Portugal during Moorish rule in the Al-Andalus period, beginning in 711 with the Umayyad conquest of Hispania, even if most of the population still followed Christianity according to the Mozarabic Rite. In the north, however, Christianity provided the cultural and religious cement that helped hold Portugal together as a distinctive entity, at least since the reconquest of Porto in 868 by Vímara Peres, the founder of the First County of Portugal. By the same token, Christianity was the rallying cry of those who rose up against the Moors and sought to drive them out. Hence, Christianity and the Catholic Church pre-dated the establishment of the Portuguese nation, a point that shaped relations between the two.

Under Afonso Henriques (r. 1139–1185), the first king of Portugal and the founder of the Portuguese Kingdom, church and state were unified into a lasting and mutually beneficial partnership. To secure papal recognition of his country, Afonso declared Portugal a vassal state of the Pope, and was as such recognized in 1179 through the papal bull Manifestis Probatum. The King found the Church to be a useful ally as he drove the Moors towards the South. For its support of his policies, Afonso richly rewarded the Church by granting it vast lands and privileges in the conquered territories. The Church became the country's largest landowner, and its power came to be equal to that of the nobility, the military orders, and even, for a time, the Crown. But Afonso also asserted his supremacy over the Church, a supremacy that — with various ups and downs — was maintained.

Although relations between the Portuguese State and the Catholic Church were generally amiable and stable, their relative power fluctuated. In the 13th and 14th centuries, the Church enjoyed both riches and power stemming from its role in the reconquest and its close identification with early Portuguese nationalism. For a time, the Church's position vis-à-vis the State diminished until the growth of the Portuguese Overseas Empire made its missionaries important agents of colonization (see, for example, Kingdom of Kongo).

Until the 15th century, some Jews occupied prominent places in Portuguese political and economical life. For example, Isaac Abrabanel was the treasurer of King Afonso V of Portugal. Many also had an active role in the Portuguese culture, and they kept their reputation of diplomats and merchants. By this time, Lisbon and Évora were home to important Jewish communities. In 1497, reflecting events that had occurred five years earlier in Spain, Portugal expelled the Jews and the few remaining Moors — or forced them to convert. In 1536, the Pope gave King João III (r. 1521–1557) permission to establish the Portuguese Inquisition to enforce the purity of the faith. Earlier, the country had been rather tolerant, but now orthodoxy and intolerance reigned. The Jesuit Order was placed in charge of all education.

In the 18th century, anti-Church sentiment became strong. The Marquês de Pombal (r. 1750–1777) expelled the Jesuits in 1759, broke relations with the Holy See in Rome, and brought education under the State's control. Pombal was eventually removed from his office, and many of his reforms were undone, but anti-clericalism remained a force in Portuguese society. In 1821, the Inquisition was abolished, religious orders were banned, and the Church lost much of its property. Relations between Church and State improved in the second half of the 19th century, but a new wave of anti-clericalism emerged with the establishment of the Portuguese First Republic in 1910. Not only were Church properties seized and education secularized, but the Republic went so far as to ban the ringing of church bells, the wearing of clerical garb on the streets, and the holding of many popular religious festivals. With the outbreak of the First World War the Portuguese First Republic viewed it as a unique opportunity to achieve a number of goals: putting an end to the twin threats of a Spanish invasion of Portugal and of foreign occupation of the colonies and, at the internal level, creating a national consensus around the regime. These domestic objectives were not met and the armed forces, whose political awareness had grown during the war, and whose leaders had not forgiven the regime for sending them to a war they did not want to fight, seemed to represent, to conservative forces, the last bastion of "order" against the "chaos" that was taking over the country. By the mid-1920s the domestic and international scenes began to favour an authoritarian solution, wherein a strengthened executive might restore political and social order.

=== Estado Novo ===
Under the Estado Novo, the corporatist totalitarian regime of António de Oliveira Salazar (r. 1932–1968), the Church experienced a revival. Salazar was himself deeply religious and infused with Catholic precepts. Before studying law, he had been a seminarian; his roommate at the University of Coimbra, Manuel Gonçalves Cerejeira, later became Cardinal Patriarch of Lisbon. In addition, Salazar's corporatist principles and his constitution and labour statute of 1933 were infused with Roman Catholic precepts from the papal encyclicals Rerum novarum (1891) and Quadragesimo anno (1931).

Salazar's state claimed to base itself on the principles of traditional Roman Catholicism, with an emphasis on order, discipline, and authority. Class relations were supposedly based on harmony rather than the Marxist concept of conflict. The family, the parish, and Christianity were said to be the foundations of the State. Salazar went considerably beyond these principles, however, and established a full-fledged dictatorship. His corporate government, in the opinion of some, contained about equal blends of Roman Catholic principles and Benito Mussolini-like fascism.

In 1940, a Concordat governing Church–State relations was signed between Portugal and the Vatican. The Church was to be "separate" from the State but to enjoy a special position. The Concordat of 1940 reversed many of the anticlerical policies adopted during the First Republic, and the Catholic Church was given exclusive control over religious instruction in the public schools. Only Catholic clergy could serve as chaplains in the armed forces. Divorce, which had been legalized by the republic, was made illegal for those married in a Church service, but remained legal with respect to civil marriage. The Church was given formal "juridical personality," enabling it to incorporate and hold property.

Under Salazar, critics believe that Church and State in Portugal maintained a comfortable and mutually reinforcing relationship. While assisting the Church in many ways, however, Salazar insisted that it stay out of politics — unless it praised his regime. Dissent and criticism were forbidden; those clergy who stepped out of line — an occasional parish priest and once the Bishop of Porto — were silenced or forced to leave the country. The rest of the Roman Catholic Church hierarchy, led by Cardinal Manuel Gonçalves Cerejeira, a great friend and supporter of Salazar, remained silent on the issue.

=== Changes after the Revolution of 1974 ===
In the Portuguese Constitution of 1976, after the Carnation Revolution of 1974 and the transition to democracy, Church and State were again formally separated. The Church continues to have a special place in Portugal, but for the most part, it has been disestablished. Other religions are now free to organize and practice their beliefs.

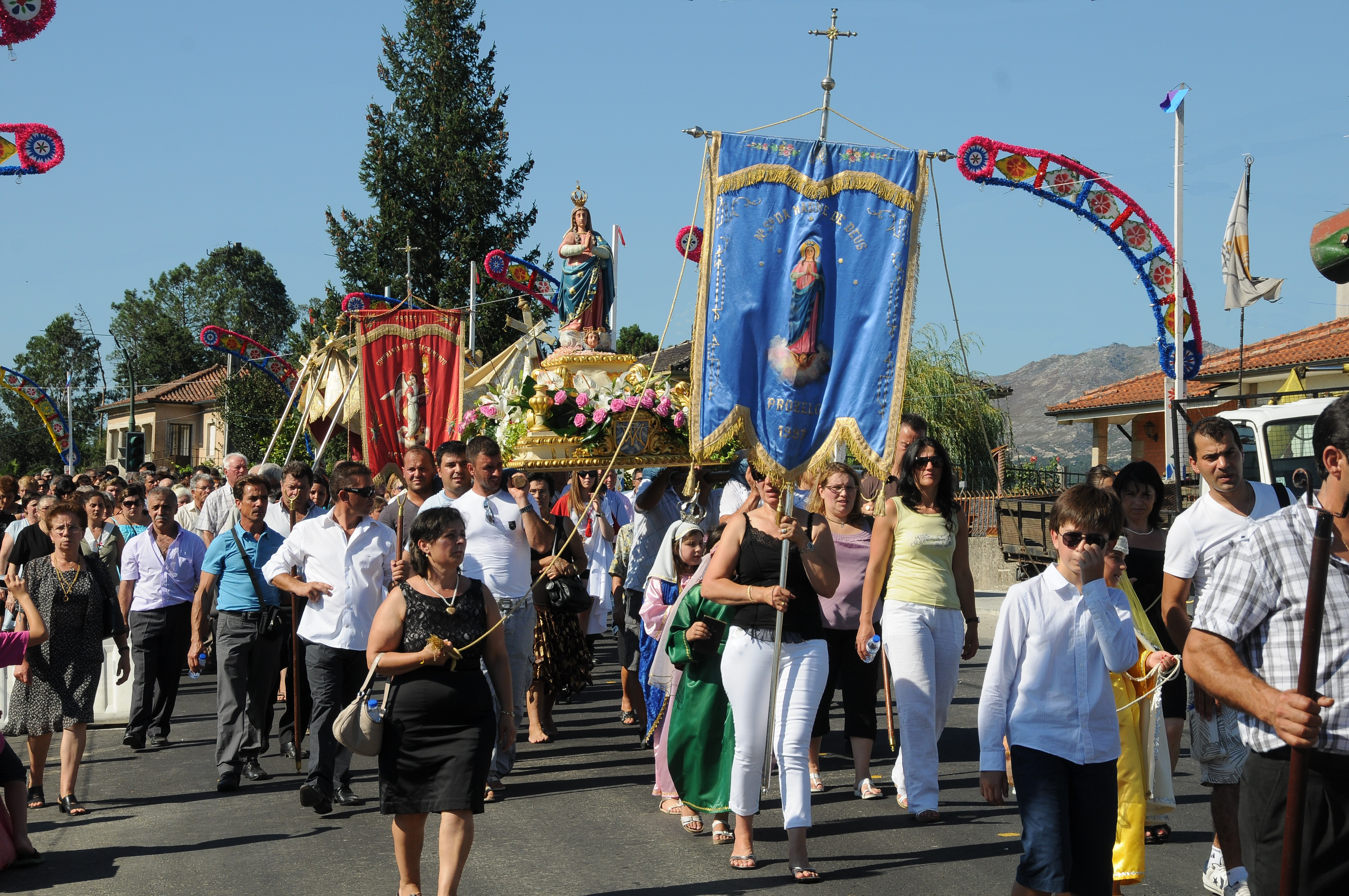
Catholic procession in Prozelo

In addition to constitutional changes, Portugal became a more secular society. The practice of religion has since declined. The number of men becoming priests fell, as did charitable offerings and attendance at Mass. By the early 1990s, most Portuguese still considered themselves Roman Catholic in a vaguely cultural and religious sense, but only about one-third of them attended Mass regularly. Indifference to religion was most likely among men and young people. Regular churchgoers were most often women and young children.

The Church no longer had its former social influence. During the 19th century and on into the Salazar regime, the Church was one of the most powerful institutions in the country—along with the Army and the social and economic elite. In fact, military, economic, governmental, and religious influences in Portugal were closely intertwined and interrelated, often literally so. Traditionally, the first son of elite families inherited land, the second went into the army, and the third became a bishop. By the early 1990s, however, the Catholic Church no longer enjoyed this pre-eminence but had fallen to seventh or eighth place in power among Portuguese interest groups.

By the 1980s, the Church seldom tried to influence how Portuguese voted, knowing such attempts would probably backfire. During the height of the revolutionary turmoil in the mid-1970s, the Church urged its communicants to vote for centrist and conservative candidates and to repudiate communists, especially in northern Portugal, but after that the Church refrained from such an overt political role.

The Church was not able to prevent the enactment of the constitution of 1976, which separated Church and State, nor could it block legislation liberalizing divorce or abortion, issues it regarded as moral and within the realm of its responsibility.

== Religious practices ==
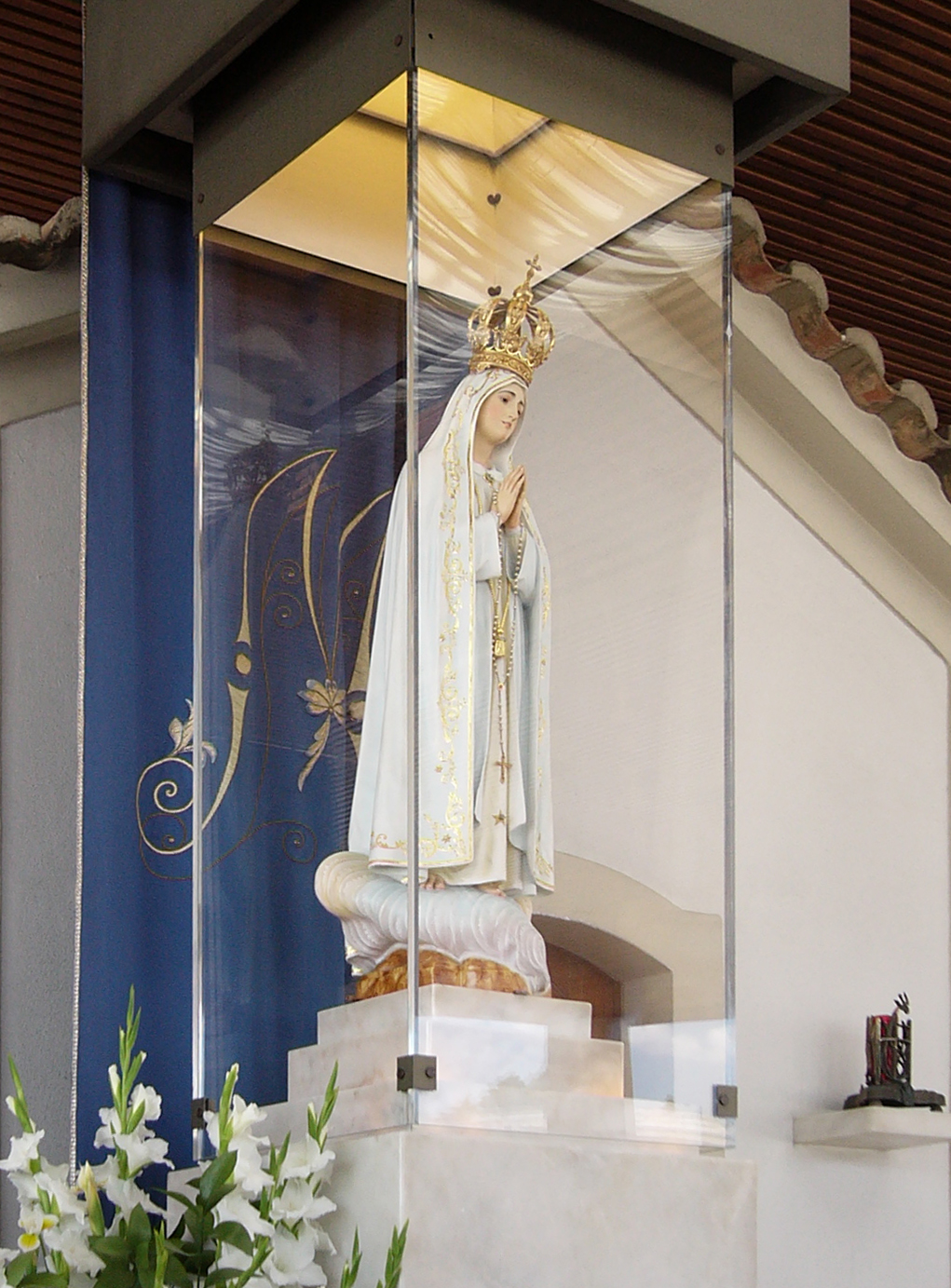
The image of Our Lady of Fátima present in the Chapel of the Apparitions, Cova da Iria, at the Sanctuary of Fátima

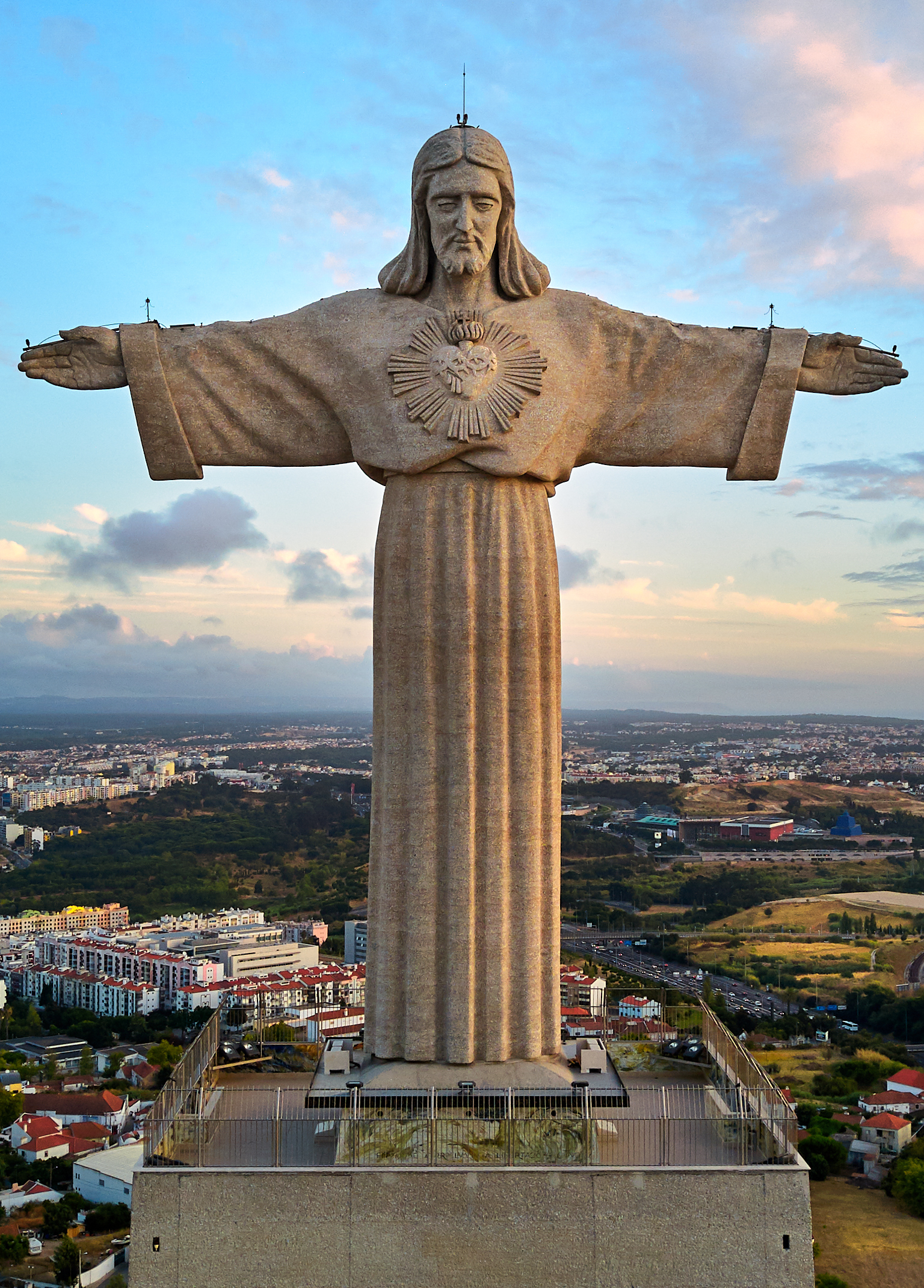
The Sanctuary of Christ the King overlooking Lisbon in Almada

The practice of religion in Portugal has shown striking regional differences. Even in the early 1990s, 60 to 70 percent of the population in the traditionally Catholic North regularly attended religious services, compared with 10 to 15 percent in the historically anti-clerical South. In the Greater Lisbon Area, about 30 percent were regular churchgoers.

The traditional importance of Catholicism in the lives of the Portuguese is evident in the physical organization of almost every village in Portugal. The village churches are usually in prominent locations, either on the main square or on a hilltop overlooking the village. Many of the churches and chapels were built in the 16th century at the height of Portugal's colonial expansion, and were often decorated with wood and gold leaf from the conquests. In recent decades, however, they were often in disrepair, for there were not enough priests to tend them. Many were used only rarely to honor the patron saints of the villages.

Much of the country's religious life has traditionally taken place outside the formal structure and official domain of the Catholic Church. This is especially true in rural areas where the celebration of saints' days and religious festivals is popular. The most famous religious event in Portugal has been the claimed apparition of the Virgin Mary to three children in Cova da Iria, in the village of Fátima, in 1917. Two of the children, Jacinta and Francisco Marto, were beatified in 2000 and canonized saints in 2017 by Pope Francis. The apparition of the Heavenly Mother in this small village in the district of Santarém has led hundreds of thousands of pilgrims to visit the Sanctuary of Our Lady of Fátima each year, many in the hope of receiving healing.

Women tended to practice their religion more than men did, as evidenced by church attendance. The image of the Virgin, as well as that of Christ, were commonly displayed, even in labour union offices or on signs in demonstrations.

Other aspects of Portuguese folk religion were not approved by the official Church, including witchcraft, magic, and sorcery. Formal religion, folk beliefs, and superstition were frequently jumbled together. Particularly in the isolated villages of northern Portugal, belief in witches, witchcraft, and evil spirits was widespread. Some persons believed in the concept of the "evil eye" and feared those who supposedly possessed it. Again, women were the main practitioners. Almost every village had its "seers," practitioners of magic, and "healers." Evil spirits and even werewolves were thought to inhabit the mountains and byways, and it was believed that people must be protected from them. Children and young women were thought to be particularly vulnerable to the "evil eye."

As people became better educated and moved to the city, they lost some of these folk beliefs. But in the city and among educated persons alike, superstition could still be found, even in the early 1990s. Sorcerers, palm readers, and readers of cards had shops, particularly in poorer neighborhoods, but not exclusively so. In short, a strong undercurrent of superstition still remained in Portugal. The formal Church disapproved of superstitious practices but was powerless to do much about them.

In contrast to that of Spain, Roman Catholicism in Portugal was softer and less intense. The widespread use of folk practices and the humanization of religion made for a loving though remote God, in contrast to the harshness of the Spanish vision. In Portugal, unlike Spain, God and his saints were imagined as forgiving and serene. In Spain, the expressions depicted on the faces of saints and martyrs were painful and anguished; in Portugal they were complacent, calm, and pleasant.

== Other Christians ==
=== Protestantism ===
For most of Portugal's history, few non-Roman Catholics lived in the country; those who did could not practice their religion freely. They had been kept out of the country for three centuries by the Inquisition. However, the British began settling in Portugal in the nineteenth century brought other Christian denominations with them. Most belonged to the Anglican Church of England, but others were Protestant Methodists, Congregationalists, Baptists, and Presbyterians. The establishment of a constitutional monarchy in 1834 granted limited religious toleration, and consequently led to the opening of an Anglican chapel (St. George's Church, Lisbon).

The oldest Portuguese-speaking Protestant denomination is the Igreja Evangélica Presbiteriana de Portugal (Evangelical Presbyterian Church in Portugal), tracing its origins back to the work of a Scottish missionary on Madeira in 1838. An official church group was established in 1845, with another church being created in Lisbon in 1871.

A second Anglican chapel was opened in Portugal in 1868. The Anglican mission coincided with the growing influence of the Old Catholic movement in Portugal. Congregations were created from Roman Catholic priests and laypeople who refused to accept the dogmas of the infallibility and universal ordinary jurisdiction of the Pope, as defined by the First Vatican Council in 1870. The Lusitanian Catholic Apostolic Evangelical Church was formed as a result in 1880 (and has been a member church of the Anglican Communion since 1980); however, laws still restricted the activities of non-Roman Catholics.

St Andrew's Church, Lisbon - a congregation of the Church of Scotland - was created in 1866, and a building completed in 1899).

By the early 1990s, only some 50,000 to 60,000 Anglicans and Protestants lived in Portugal, less than 1 percent of the total population. The 1950s and 1960s saw the arrival of Pentecostals, The Church of Jesus Christ of Latter-day Saints, and Jehovah's Witnesses, all of whom increased in numbers more rapidly than the earlier arrivals did. All groups, however, were hampered by prohibitions and restrictions against the free exercise of their religions, especially missionary activities.

These restrictions were lifted after the Revolution of 1974. The constitution of 1976 guarantees all religions the right to practice their faith. Non–Roman Catholic groups came to be recognized as legal entities with the right to assemble. Portuguese who were both not Roman Catholics and were conscientious objectors had the right to apply for alternative military service. The Roman Catholic Church, however, still sought to place barriers in the way of missionary activities.

Legislation on religious freedom in the country was adopted in 2001, with a concordant being signed in 2004.

The 2021 census noted that there were approximately 200,000 evangelical Protestants in Portugal and more than 75,000 non-evangelical Protestants (about 2.6% in total).

=== Eastern Orthodoxy ===
The Eastern Orthodox Church is present in small numbers in Portugal, mostly through diaspora from Eastern European countries with a native Eastern Orthodox population. Some are organised through local jurisdictions of their mother churches, most often headed from Spain or other neighbouring countries. These include:

- The Greek Orthodox Metropolis of Spain and Portugal, part of the Ecumenical Patriarchate of Constantinople and based in Madrid. It was established in 2003 from part of the Greek Orthodox Metropolis of France.
- The Serbian Orthodox Eparchy of Western Europe, based in Paris, has one missionary parish in Portugal.
- The Romanian Orthodox Metropolis of Western and Southern Europe, based in Paris, has an auxiliary bishop in Spain and Portugal.
- The Eparchy of Central and Western Europe of the Bulgarian Orthodox Church (with seat in Berlin), has one parish in Portugal.
- The Diocese of Geneva and Western Europe of the Russian Orthodox Church Outside Russia, headed from Geneva by Archbishop Michael (Donskoff), also has one parish in Portugal.
- The Spanish-Portuguese Exarchate of the Russian Orthodox Church, based in Madrid, claims 11 parishes in Portugal. It was established in December 2018 following the rupture of relations between Moscow and Constantinople. The latter had previously cared for Russian parishes through the Archdiocese of Russian Orthodox churches in Western Europe, based in Paris.

There is also a non-canonical jurisdiction, the Lusitanian Catholic Orthodox Church, which defines itself as both Independent Catholic and Eastern Orthodox. It does not have any recognition from the canonical jurisdictions above.

=== The Church of Jesus Christ of Latter-day Saints ===
There is a small population of Latter Day saints living in Portugal. The Church reports 50,341 members and 64 congregations. The Church also completed and dedicated its first temple in Portugal in 2019.

== Other religions ==
=== Islam ===
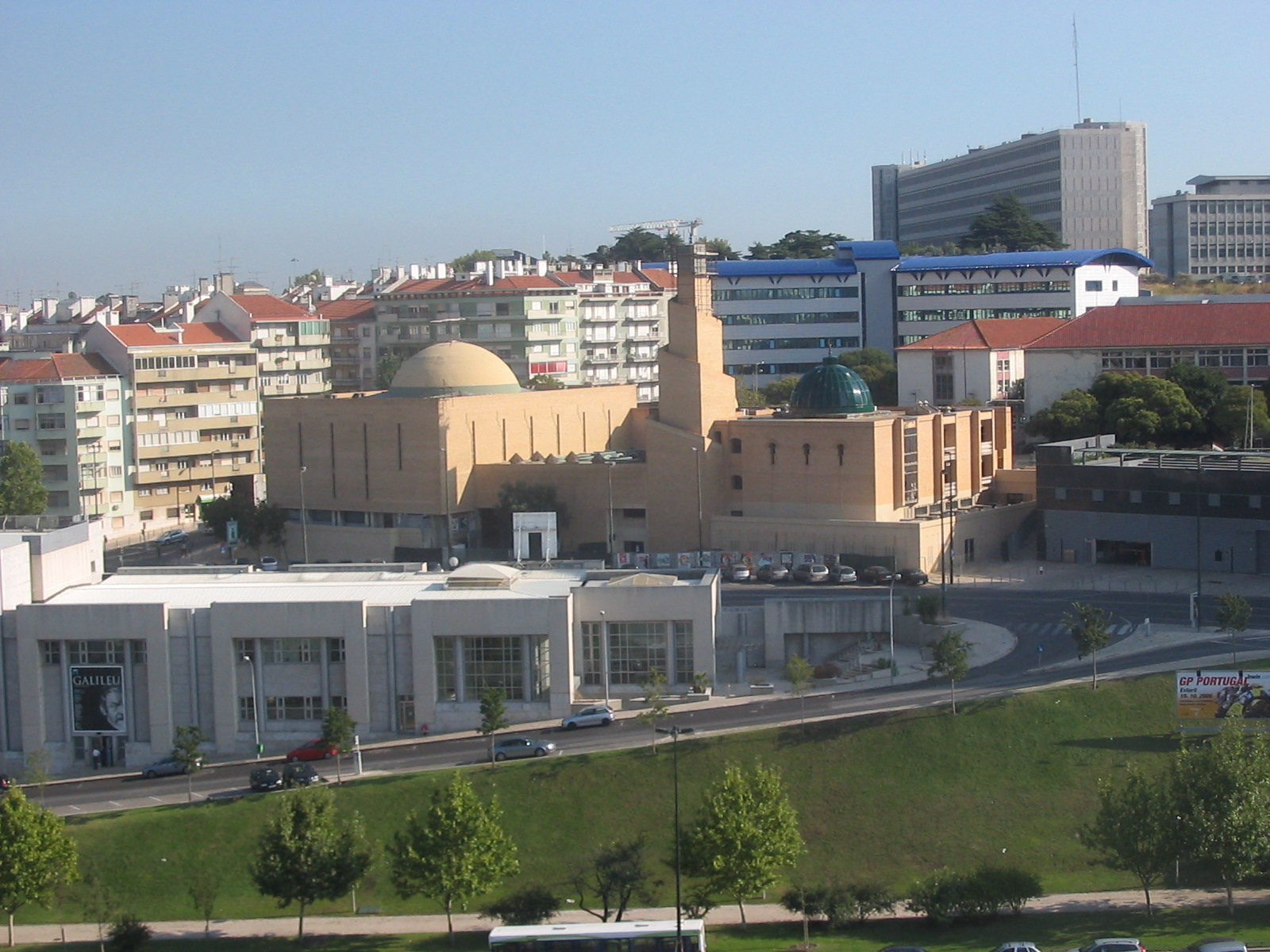
The Lisbon Mosque

Portugal's Muslim community consists of a small number of immigrants from Portugal's former colonies in Africa, namely Mozambique and Guinea-Bissau, and small numbers of recent immigrant workers from Northern Africa, mainly Morocco. In the 1991 census the number of Muslims in Portugal was under 10,000. The Muslim population in 2019 is approximately 65,000 people. The main Mosque in Portugal is the Lisbon Mosque. The majority of Muslims in the country are Sunnis, followed by approximately 5,000 to 7,000 Nizari Ismaili Shia Muslims. There is also a limited number of Ahmadiyya Muslims.

In 2015, Lisbon was chosen to be the global seat of the Nizari Shi'a community; the second largest Shi'a denomination in the world. Their spiritual leader, the Aga Khan IV, purchased the historical Mendonça Palace to use as its headquarters, as well as the headquarters of his foundation.

=== Judaism ===
The Jewish community in Portugal numbered between 500 and 1,000 as of the early 1990s. The community was concentrated in Lisbon, and many of its members were foreigners. The persecution of Portuguese Jewry had been so intense that until the twentieth century Portugal had no synagogue or even regular Jewish religious services (the Lisbon Synagogue was founded in 1904). The few Jewish Portuguese were hence isolated from the main currents of Judaism. Their community began to revive when larger numbers of foreign Jews (embassy personnel, business people, and technicians) began coming to Portugal in the 1960s and 1970s. In northern Portugal, there are a few villages where Marranos, descendants of Jews who converted to Christianity to avoid persecution and whose religion was a mixture of Judaism and Christianity, still exist (see Belmonte Jews) numbering several thousand.

=== Baháʼí Faith ===
The first visitor of the Baháʼí Faith to Portugal was in 1926. Its first Baháʼí Local Spiritual Assembly was elected in Lisbon in 1946. In 1962 the Portuguese Baháʼís elected their first National Spiritual Assembly. In 1963 there were nine assemblies. The population of the Baháʼí community Ain Portugal was estimated at some 2,100 members in 2010 according to the Association of Religion Data Archives (relying on World Christian Encyclopedia).

=== Hinduism ===
From the mid-1990s on there was an influx of Hindus of Nepalese origin in Portugal as a result of labour migration originated from that South Asian country. It is also possible to find in the Metropolitan Areas of all the regions several Hare Krishna communities, consisting mainly of non-Portuguese Europeans, Brazilians, Americans and a few Portuguese. Besides this, there is a Hindu community of approximately 19,471 Hindus actually in Portugal, which largely traces its origins to Indians who emigrated from the former Portuguese colonies of Lusophone Africa, particularly from Mozambique, and from the former colony of Goa and other possessions in Portuguese India.

Hindus in Portugal are, according to the Indian Embassy in Lisbon, mainly Gujaratis (Gujarati is taught at the Hindu Community Cultural Centre in Lisbon), Punjabis and Goans. The majority of the Hindus live in the Lisbon and Porto Metropolitan areas.

=== Buddhism ===
There is also a small population of between 50,000 and 80,000 Buddhists and Buddhist sympathisers (respectively) in Portugal. More than any other non-Christian denomination, and more than any other when it comes to sympathizers. A new Buddhist Vihara called Sumedharama, has been founded in July 2010 and located at north west of Lisbon, near Ericeira. The Bacalhôa Buddha Eden Oriental Park, near Bombarral, is also a recent Buddhist inspired garden, although not strictly a worshipping place; It was built as a protest to the destruction of the Bamyan Buddhas in Afghanistan in the early 2000s.

=== Sikhism ===
Many Sikhs started to emigrate to Portugal since the 1990s from Punjab, India for work in the agricultural, tourism and manufacturing sectors. Many Sikhs have opened up Indian restaurants around Portugal. The Indian Embassy of Portugal has estimated there to be 35,000 Sikhs. Many of whom are currently unrecognised in the official census data due to lack of residency documentation.

Most Sikhs can be found in Lisbon, Porto and Albufeira where there are Gurdwaras (Sikh Place of Worship).

== Irreligion ==
There are between 420,960 and 947,160 (4 to 9% of total population) atheist, agnostic, and irreligious people, according to other sources 6.5% of the population.

According to the 2021 Census, there were 1,237,130 (14.09%) people who specifically stated they were without religion. According to a report by Pew Research Centre published in 2018, around 13% of Portugal stated they did not believe in God.

== See also ==
- Catholic Church and the Age of Discovery
- Cult of the Holy Spirit
- Dissolution of the monasteries in Portugal
- Fifth Empire
- History of Roman Catholicism in Portugal
- Sebastianism
