= French Protestants (disambiguation) =

French Protestants may refer to:

- Protestantism in France
- Huguenots
- Taizé Community
