= St Paul's Cathedral, Lisbon =

- Catedral de São Paulo, Lisboa
- (Part of former Convento dos Marianos)
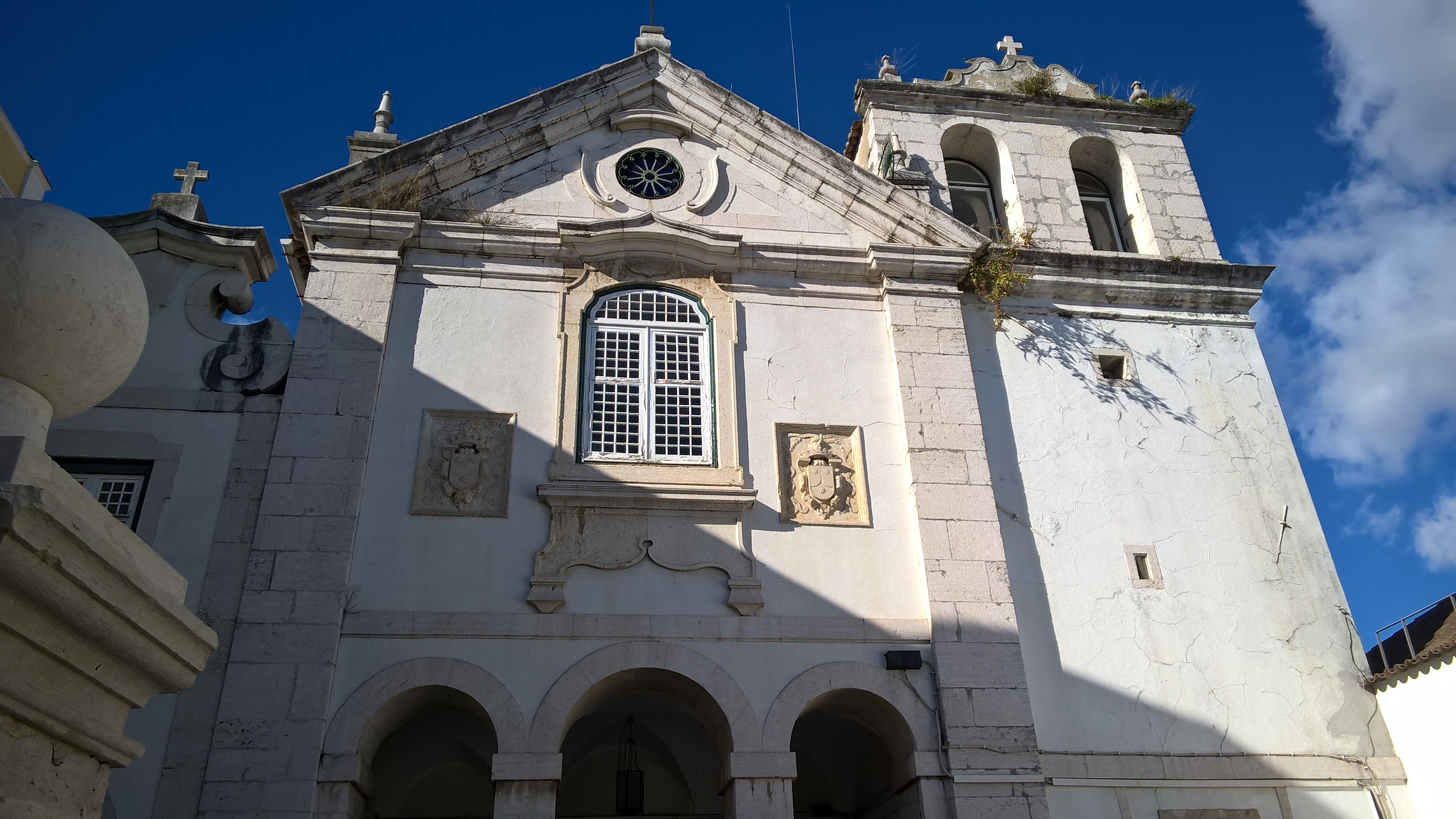
- St Paul's Cathedral, Lisbon
- 38.7067°N 9.1588°W
- Location: Rua das Janelas Verdes, 2, Lisbon
- Country: Portugal
- Denomination: Anglican
- Previous denomination: Catholic

History
- Status: Cathedral
- Founded: 1606
- Dedication: Paul the Apostle

Architecture
- Functional status: Active
- Style: Mannerist
- Groundbreaking: 1606
- Completed: 1611

Administration
- Province: Extra-provincial
- Diocese: Lusitania

St Paul's Cathedral (Portuguese: Catedral de São Paulo) is an Anglican cathedral in Lisbon, seat of the Lusitanian Catholic Apostolic Evangelical Church, which is a member church of the Anglican Communion. It is situated on Rua das Janelas Verdes, in the freguesia of Prazeres.

== History ==
The cathedral is located in what was the complex of a Discalced Carmelites convent known as Convent of Our Lady of the Remédios or Convent of the Marianos. Construction of the convent began in 1606 and completed in 1611. Built in Mannerist architectural style, with its simplicity according to the rules of the Order of the Discalced Carmelites.

After the abolition of the religious order and dismissal of the friars, the complex was converted into barracks in 1835, serving for the seventeenth battalion of the National Guard of Portugal, and the headquarters of the police station since the following year.

In 1872, the building was put up for sale at a public auction, the property was bought by the Presbyterian Free Church of Scotland, which generated a lot of controversy due to the religious issue. In 1898, the complex was acquired by the Portuguese Anglican Lusitanian Church, and part of it was converted into the Church's headquarters.

== See also ==
- St George's Church, Lisbon
- Protestantism in Portugal
