= Musée protestant =

Museum in France

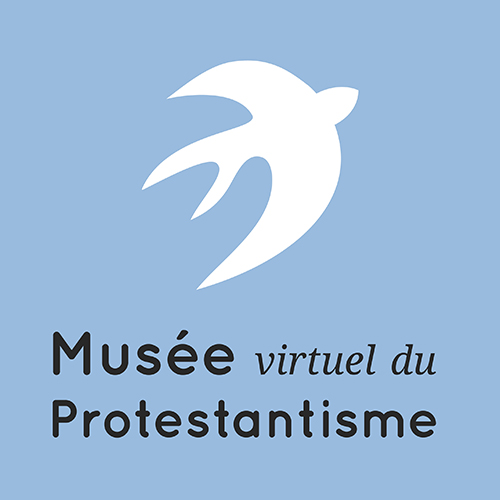
- Website type: Virtual museum
- Available in: French, English, German
- Owner: Fondation Bersier
- Website: www.museeprotestant.org
- Launched: January 9, 2003
- Current status: Online

The Musée protestant, created in 2003 by the Fondation pasteur Eugène Bersier, recounts the history of Protestantism in France from the 16th century to the present.

== History ==
In March 1994, The Fédération protestante de France authorized the Fondation pasteur Eugène Bersier to find a new location for its offices in Paris, France. After evolving toward a memorial site and a museum of the Bible and of Protestantism, the project was abandoned.

In 2000, unable to participate in the creation of an actual museum on the history of Protestantism, the Foundation decided, with the Historical Society of French Protestantism, to set up a museum on the Internet: the Virtual Museum of French Protestantism, which seeks to share the specific characteristics of Protestants through the history of Protestantism.

The museum site, which can be visited free of charge, opened in January 2003. It quickly attracted a wide audience, which increased with the offering of English and German versions of the site, thanks to the support of the Île-de-France region and the Ministry of culture.

In 2014, the design and navigation of the site were completely revamped while preserving the existing content.

In 2018, the Museum changed its name and became the Musée protestant (the Protestant Museum).

== Content ==
The Musée protestant offers over a thousand articles, classified into four headings, illustrated by 3,000 images. The articles are augmented with video clips, documents and bibliographic references and are accessible in French, English and German. The articles can also be organized into tours that group these articles by theme in a relevant order, similar to guided tours. On the home page, a time line illustrates the major dates of the history of Protestantism.

The four main headings of the museum are the following:

1. History,
2. Key figures,
3. Themes,
4. Art – Heritage.

A few exhibits that have been presented by Protestant museums are also offered with specific articles.

Since May 4, 2015, the Museum has offered an online tour for the class on the Protestant Reformation specially designed for French fifth form junior high school students with adapted educational articles containing numerous audio components, images, video clips and documents designed for teachers and a learning assessment questionnaire.

== See also ==
- Protestantism
- Martin Luther
- Jean Calvin
- Edict of Nantes
- French Wars of Religion
- Protestantism in France
