= Conference of Protestant Churches in Latin Countries of Europe =

European Christian ecumenical organization

The Conference of Protestant Churches in Latin Countries of Europe (French: Conférence des Églises protestantes des pays latins d'Europe) is a Christian ecumenical organization founded in 1950. It is a member of the World Council of Churches. Its members belong to Protestant churches in Belgium, France, Italy, Portugal, Spain, and Switzerland.The CPCE consists of 96 member churches.

== See also ==
- Protestantism in Belgium
- Protestantism in France
- Protestantism in Italy
- Protestantism in Portugal
- Protestantism in Spain
- Protestantism in Switzerland
