= Jorge Pina Cabral =

20th and 21st-century Portuguese Anglican bishop

The Right Reverend Jorge Pina Cabral
- Bishop of the Lusitanian Church
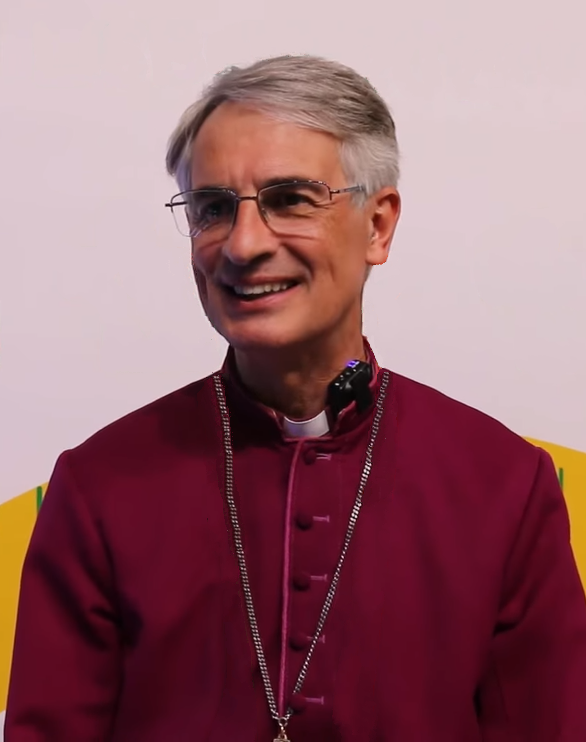
- Province: Extra-provincial
- Diocese: Lusitanian Church
- In office: 2013–present
- Other posts: Honorary assistant bishop, CofE Diocese in Europe

Orders
- Ordination: 1995 (deacon); 1997 (priest)
- Consecration: 25 April 2013 by Fernando Soares

Personal details
- Born: 22 May 1966 (age 60) Porto, Porto District, Portugal
- Denomination: Lusitanian
- Spouse: Rute
- Children: two

José Jorge Tavares de Pina Cabral (born 22 May 1966) is a Portuguese Anglican bishop. He has been the Bishop of the Lusitanian Church since 2013. He is the nephew of Daniel Pina Cabral, who was Bishop of the Diocese of Lebombo, in Mozambique. He married Rute Serronha in 1996 and has two children.

== Studies and ecclesiastical career ==
Born in Porto, Pina Cabral gained a degree in Physical Education and Sports Studies, from the University of Porto, and afterward taught in high schools around Porto. He studied at the Lusitanian Center for Theological Studies and later gained a further degree in Religious Studies at the Catholic University of Porto.

Pina Cabral was ordained a deacon in 1995 and a priest in 1997, beginning his ministry taking responsibility for two parishes, St John the Evangelist and the Good Shepherd; he also served as the Northern Archdeacon (centred in Porto; 1998) and Vicar-General of the diocese (2007). He was elected by the 94th Synod in November 2012 to become diocesan Bishop of the Lusitanian Church.

Pina Cabral was consecrated a bishop by his predecessor Fernando Soares at St Paul's Cathedral in São Paulo, Lisbon, on 25 April 2013. As a European bishop of a church in full communion with the Archbishop of Canterbury (who is the church's metropolitan), he is also licensed as an honorary assistant bishop of the Church of England Diocese in Europe.
