= St George's Church, Lisbon =

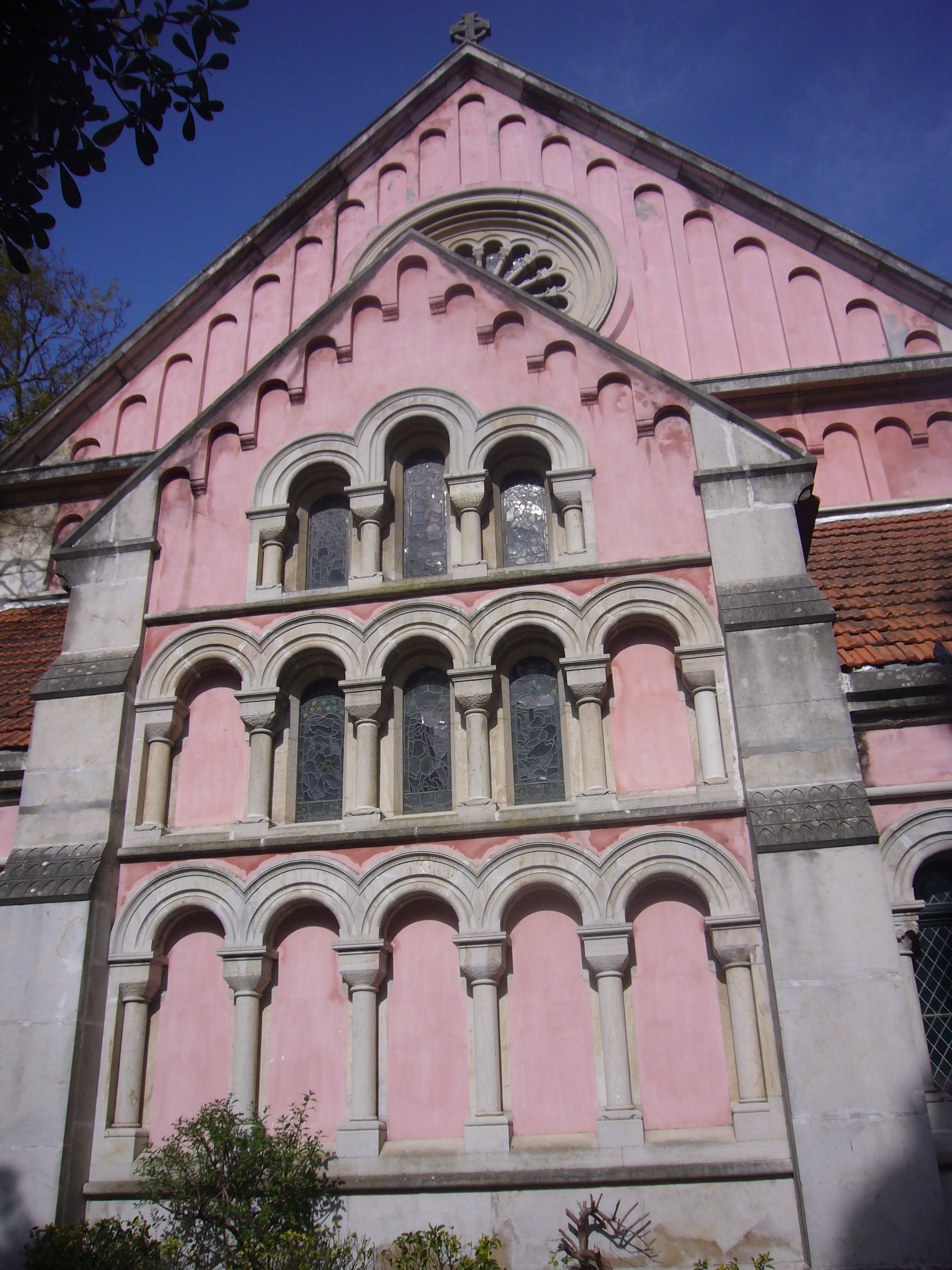
- St George's Church, Lisbon
- 38°42′59″N 9°09′38″W
- Location: Rua São Jorge 6, Lisbon
- Country: Portugal
- Denomination: Church of England
- Website: Anglican Church of St George and St Paul, Lisbon

History
- Dedication: Saint George
- Consecrated: 17 March 1889

Architecture
- Architect(s): John Medland and Charles Edward Powell
- Style: Romanesque Revival
- Years built: 1889

Administration
- Province: Canterbury
- Diocese: Europe
- Archdeaconry: Gibraltar
- Parish: Anglican Church of St George and St Paul, Lisbon

St George's Church is the only English-speaking Anglican congregation in Lisbon, Portugal. It is located at Rua São Jorge 6, north of the Estrela Garden.

== History ==
In 1654 a treaty between Lord Protector Oliver Cromwell of England and King John IV of Portugal (signed on his behalf by João Rodrigues de Sá e Menezes, Count of Penaguião) allowed English residents in Portugal to "profess their own Religion in private houses... and that finally a Place be allowed for them to bury their dead". A chaplaincy was established, with services held in the home of the British Envoy.

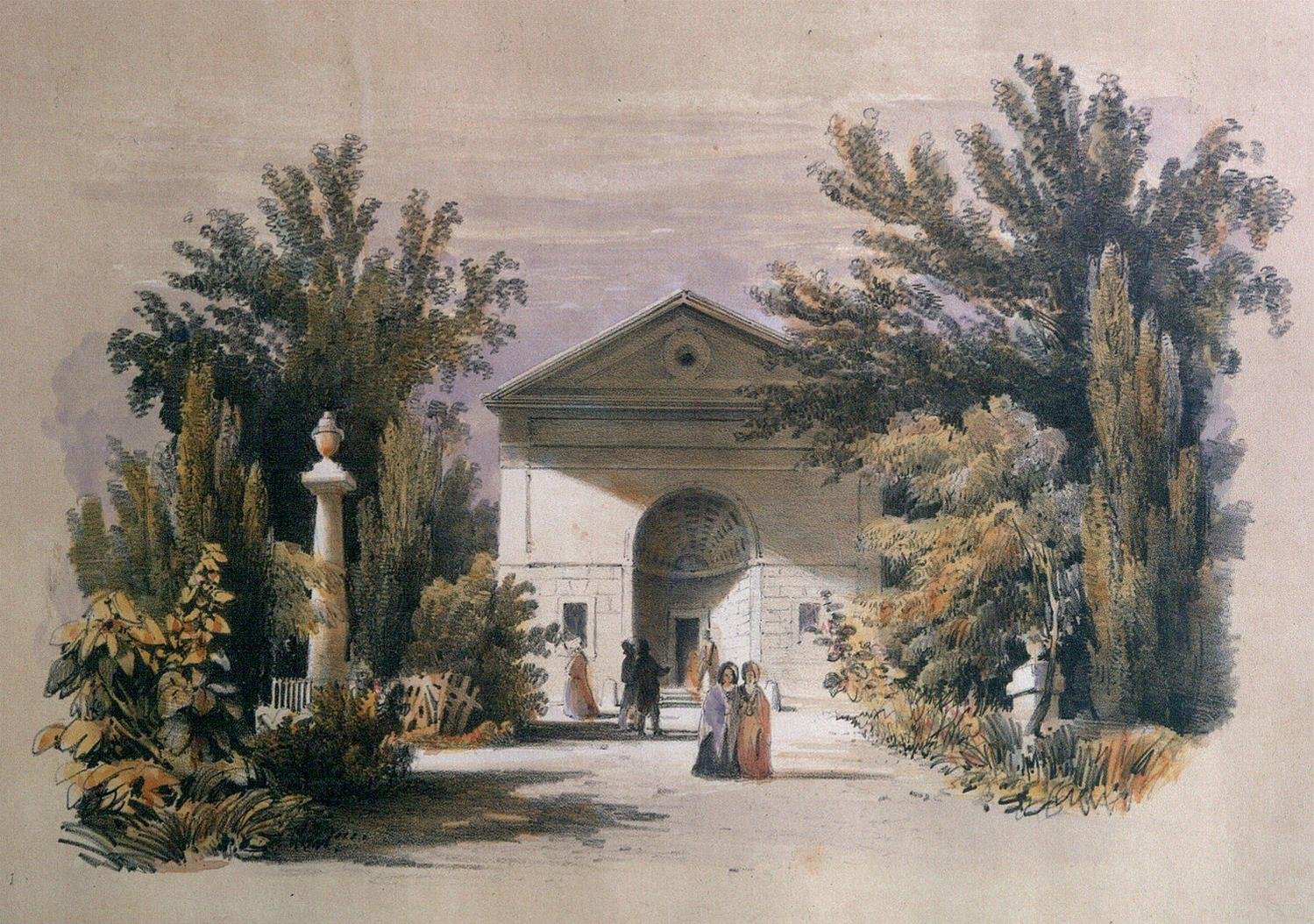
The original church, built in 1822 and destroyed by a fire in 1886.

== Cemetery ==
Although a burial ground had been promised by the 1654 treaty, implementation was thwarted by the Portuguese Inquisition. Land was finally leased in 1717; the first burial was that of Francis La Roche, a Huguenot refugee, who died in 1724.

Notable burials in the cemetery include the tombs of the writer Henry Fielding, of hymn-writer Philip Doddridge, of merchant David de Pury, astronomer Carl Ludwig Christian Rümker, Field Marshal of the Portuguese land army Christian August, Prince of Waldeck and Pyrmont and diplomat Thomas Barclay.

The cemetery includes 31 Commonwealth War Graves: five from the First World War and 26 from the Second. 29 are in individual plots; two are in private family vaults. They include members of the British Army, Royal Navy, Royal Air Force, Royal Canadian Air Force, Merchant Navy and British Overseas Airways Corporation.

Count Miklós Horthy, a Calvinist former Vice Admiral in the Austro-Hungarian Navy and Regent of Hungary, died in exile in Portugal and was buried in the cemetery, along with his wife and son. In 1993 they were exhumed, and re-interred in the Horthy family mausoleum in Kenderes.

== Church building ==
Anglicans in Portugal petitioned for permission to build a church, but until the early 19th century the Portuguese Inquisition prevailed on the monarch not to grant it. A church of St George the Martyr was built in the cemetery in 1822. That church was consecrated in 1843 but was damaged by earthquake in 1859. It was rebuilt, but burnt down in 1886. The present church was designed by the London-based architects John Medland and Charles Edward Powell and consecrated in 1889. It is a Romanesque Revival building with a narthex, blind arcades and rose window on its west front. The windows are by Lavers & Westlake.

== Anglican Church of St George and St Paul, Lisbon ==
In 1984, St George's Church, Lisbon was amalgamated with St Paul's Church, Estoril to form the Greater Lisbon Chaplaincy, and is part of the Diocese in Europe of the Church of England. It is now named the Anglican Church of St George and St Paul, Lisbon.

== Chaplains ==
=== Chaplains of St George's ===
In the early years there were many long periods of interregnum. The last of these was from 1800 to 1812, due to the Peninsular War.

- Zachary Cradock, 1656 to 1660, subsequently Provost of Eton
- Thomas Marsden, 1661 to 1663
- Michael Geddes, 1678 to 1688, subsequently Chancellor of Salisbury Cathedral
- John Colbatch, 1688 to 1698, subsequently Knightbridge Professor of Philosophy at Cambridge
- Jonathan Swift, appointed 1702, but never went to Lisbon; subsequently well known as a satirist, and Dean of St Patrick's Cathedral, Dublin
- Joseph Wilcocks, 1709 to 1714, subsequently Bishop of Gloucester and then concurrently Bishop of Rochester and Dean of Westminster
- Joseph Simms, 1721–1734, subsequently Prebendary of Lincoln Cathedral and St Paul's Cathedral
- Staveley Parker, 1743 to 1749
- John Williamson, 1749 to 1763
- William Allen, 1763 to 1782
- Herbert Hill, 1782 to 1800
- Robert Marrat Miller, 1812 to 1818
- Thomas Hurford Siely, 1819 to 1840
- George Sayle Prior, 1841 to 1861
- Thomas Kenworthy Brown, 1861 to 1867
- Thomas Godfrey Pembroke Pope, 1867 to 1902, invited to become the bishop of the Lusitanian Church in 1889, but which he declined
- William Hawkesley Westall, 1902 to 1907
- Edward Pilcher Lewis, 1907 to 1915
- Joseph Henry Morton Nodder, 1915 to 1924
- Charles James Hamilton Dobson, 1925 to 1930
- Cyril Gerald Holland, 1930 to 1935
- Herbert Pentin, 1936 to 1937
- Harry Frank Fulford Williams, 1937 to 1945
- Hugh Farie, 1945 to 1959
- Robert William Scrymgour Dand, 1960 to 1966
- Henry Chatfield-Jude, 1966 to 1976
- Victor Andrew Joseph Ravensdale, 1977 to 1984

=== Chaplains of the Greater Lisbon Chaplaincy ===
- Kenneth William Alfred Roberts, 1984 to 1986
- Anthony Hughes Ashdown, 1987 to 1990
- John Kenneth Robinson, 1991 to 2000, subsequently Dean of Gibraltar
- Michael Bullock OGS, 2000-2012
- Nigel Leslie Stimpson, 2013-2014
- Frank Sawyer, 2016-2019
- Elizabeth Bendry, since 2020

== Fincham pipe organ ==
When the existing church was designed, traditional choir stalls were included in front of the Sanctuary and Henry Fincham of London built and installed a two-manual pipe organ for £526. It has 25 ranks with 61-note compass of the manuals and 30-note compass of the pedals. There were two minor changes to the Great organ which, in its original state, did not include mutation stops. The organ was restored in 1971.

This is the current disposition of the organ after 125 years of use:

Great – I

- 8' Open Diapason
- 8' Lieblich Gedacht
- 8' Gambe
- 4' Principal
- 2 2/3' Nazard
- 2' Fifteenth
- 1 3/5' Tierce
- 8' Corno de Bassetto
- 8' Trumpet

Pedal

- 16' Grande Open Diapason
- 16' Bourdon

Swell – II

- 16' Double Open Diapason
- 8' Horn Diapason
- 8' Stopped Diapason
- 8' Vox Angelica
- 8' Voix Celeste
- 4' Principal
- 4' Flûte a Cheminee
- 2' Fifteenth
- III Mixture
- 8' Cornopean
- 8' Hautboy
- 8' Vox Humana
- Swell Tremulant
- Swell to Great Super
- Swell to Great
- Swell to Pedal
- Great to Pedal
- Swell shades open catch mechanism
- 5 pre-set piston shoes

== See also ==
- St James' Church, Porto
- St Paul's Cathedral, Lisbon – the Anglican cathedral in Lisbon
- St Andrew's Church, Lisbon – Church of Scotland
- Estrela Basilica – Roman Catholic church and Carmelite convent nearby
