= Protestantism in France =

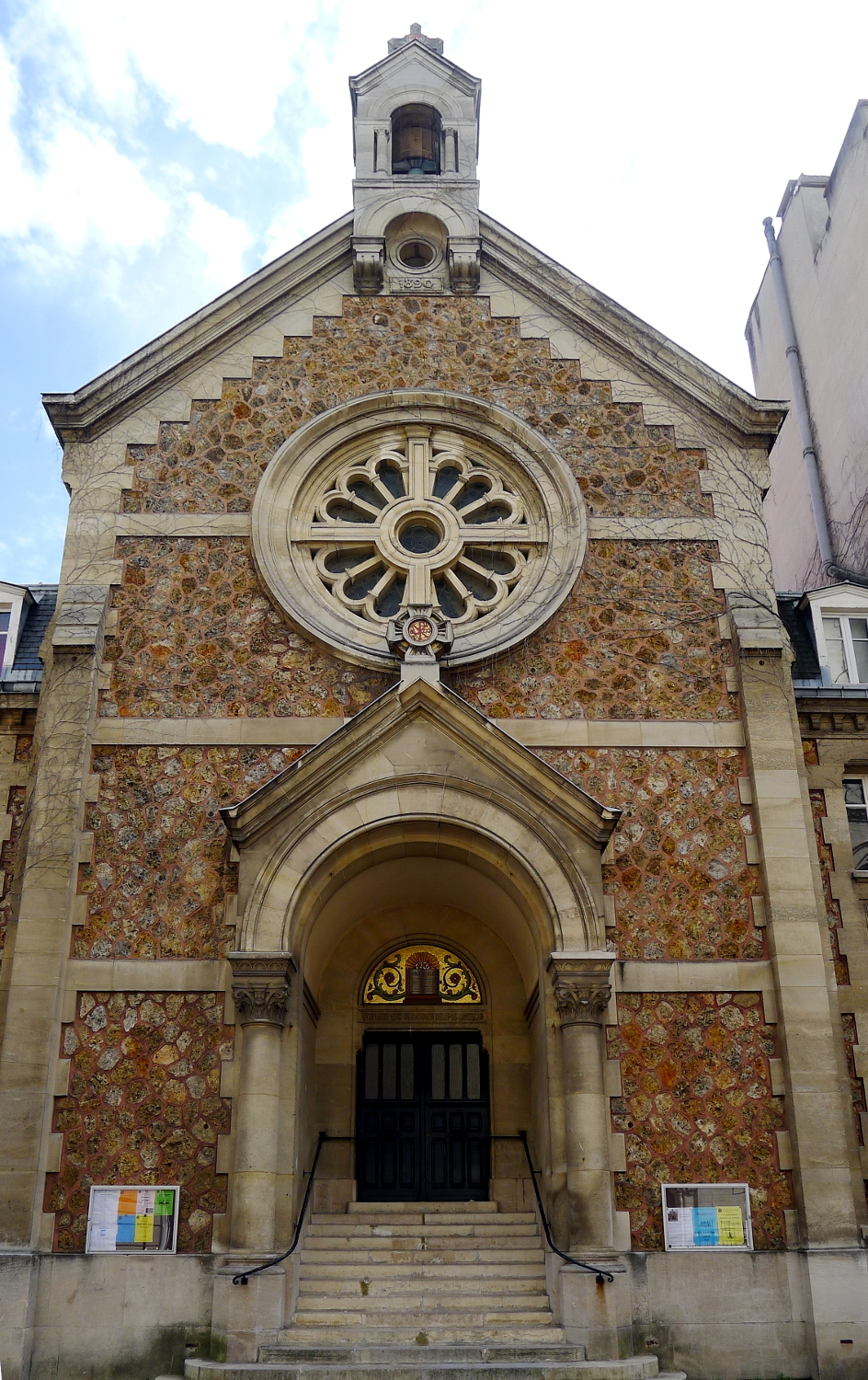
The Église réformée de l'Annonciation, Paris

Religion in France 2017 (Pew Research Center)
1. Catholicism (44.0%)
2. Protestantism (3.00%)
3. Other Christian (1.00%)
4. Irreligion (45.0%)
5. Other/don't know/refused (7.00%)

Protestantism has existed in France in various forms, starting with Calvinism and Lutheranism since the Protestant Reformation. John Calvin was a Frenchman, as were numerous other Protestant Reformers including William Farel, Pierre Viret and Theodore Beza, who was Calvin's successor in Geneva. Peter Waldo (Pierre Vaudes/de Vaux) was a merchant from Lyon, who founded a pre-Protestant group, the Waldensians. Martin Bucer was born a German in Alsace, which historically belonged to the Holy Roman Empire, but now belongs to France.

Hans J. Hillerbrand in his Encyclopedia of Protestantism claims the Huguenots reached as much as 15% of the French population on the eve of the St. Bartholomew's Day massacre, declining to 10-12% by the end of the 16th century, and further after heavy persecution began once again with the revocation of the Edict of Nantes by Louis XIV.

Protestants were granted a degree of religious freedom following the Edict of Nantes, but it ceased with the Edict of Fontainebleau. The Protestant minority was persecuted, and a majority of Huguenots fled the country, leaving isolated communities like the one in the Cevennes region, which survives to this day.

According to a 2020 survey, Protestants made up 3% of the French population. A renewed interest in Protestantism has been brought by numerous Evangelical Protestants, while the membership of Calvinist and Lutheran churches has stagnated; many of the latter two confessions have merged into the United Protestant Church of France.

== Major groups ==
Protestantism in 16th-century France. Controlled by Huguenot nobility Contested between Huguenots and Catholics Controlled by Catholic nobility Lutheran-majority area (part of the HRE)

=== Waldensians ===
A Christian sect or movement, sometimes characterized as proto-Protestant, organized around the teachings of Peter Waldo, a wealthy merchant of Lyon who lived in the 12th century. The Waldensians later moved to Northern Italy, where they experienced near decimation from Catholic authorities until the Reformation, when they affiliated with the Calvinists and other Reformed Christian groups of Switzerland, Germany and France. In the Duchy of Savoy, the Waldensians frequently faced persecution when "Sun King" Louis XIV of France put the dukes under pressure to eradicate all Protestant presence across his borders during the Savoyard–Waldensian wars (1655–1690). The group still exists in Italy, Germany, Brazil and the United States.

=== Huguenots ===
The Huguenots of the Reformed Church of France were followers of John Calvin, and became the major Protestant sect in France. A large portion of the population died in massacres or were deported from French territory following the Revocation of the Edict of Nantes in 1685. Today, the Huguenots number about one million, or about two percent of the population; They are most concentrated in southeastern France and the Cévennes region in the south. The Calvinist congregations in Alsace and Moselle are organised as the Protestant Reformed Church of Alsace and Lorraine (EPRAL).

=== Lutherans ===
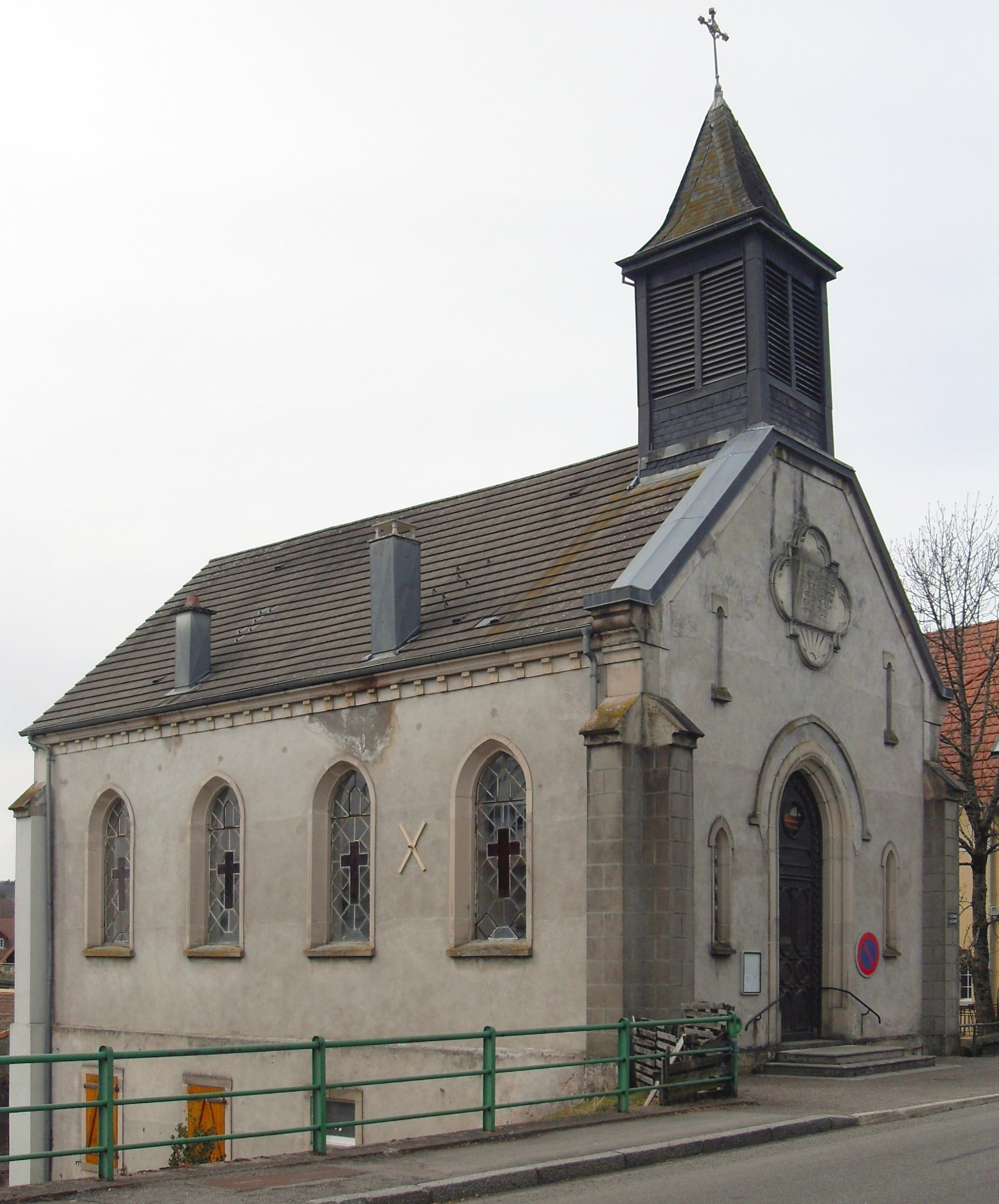
The Lutheran church at Giromagny

Lutherans formed a minority among the overall French Protestants. Their congregations were strengthened by Lutheran immigrants, mostly settling in economically prosperous places. With the French conquest of German-speaking regions along the Rhine beginning in the 17th century, the Kingdom acquired significant Lutheran populations. Under Napoleonic religious legislation of 1801 and 1802 also French Lutheranism was reorganized forming the Église de la Confession d'Augsbourg de France, established as a nationwide synod and body. It renamed as Evangelical Lutheran Church of France in 1906. In 1872, the Protestant Church of Augsburg Confession of Alsace and Lorraine (EPCAAL) had branched off, competent since for most Lutheran congregations in Alsace and Moselle.

== Diffusion ==
In a study regarding the various religions of France, based on 51 surveys held by the IFOP in the period 2011-2014, so based on a sample of 51.770 answers, there were 17.4% of Protestants in the Bas-Rhin, 7.3% in the Haut-Rhin, 7.2% in the Gard, 6.8% in the Drôme and 4.2% in the Ardèche. In the other departments this presence is residual, with, for example, only 0.5% in Côte-d'Or and in the Côtes-d'Armor.

== History ==
=== French Wars of Religion (1562–1598) ===
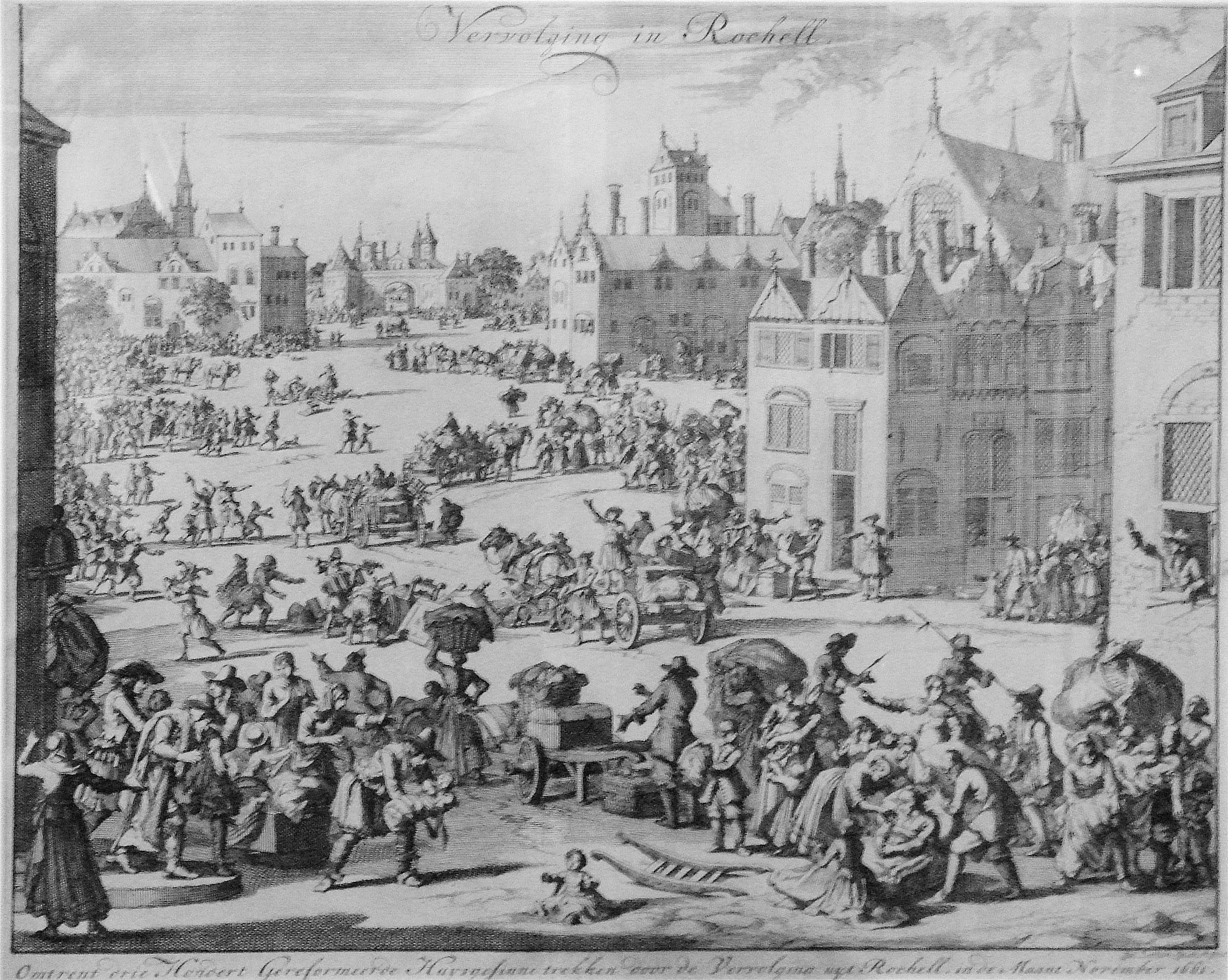
"The Expulsion from La Rochelle of 300 Protestant families in November 1661"; by Jan Luyken

=== Significant decline under Louis XIV ===
Under his rule, the Edict of Nantes which granted rights to Huguenots was abolished. The revocation effectively forced Huguenots to emigrate or convert in a wave of dragonnades. Louis XIV managed to virtually destroy the French Protestant minority, which had survived more than 150 years of wars and persecution under previous French kings.

=== Further persecution ===
Persecution formally stopped with the Edict of Versailles in 1787, although it was not until the Declaration of the Rights of Man and of the Citizen of 1789 that Protestants were fully emancipated.

=== Later establishments ===
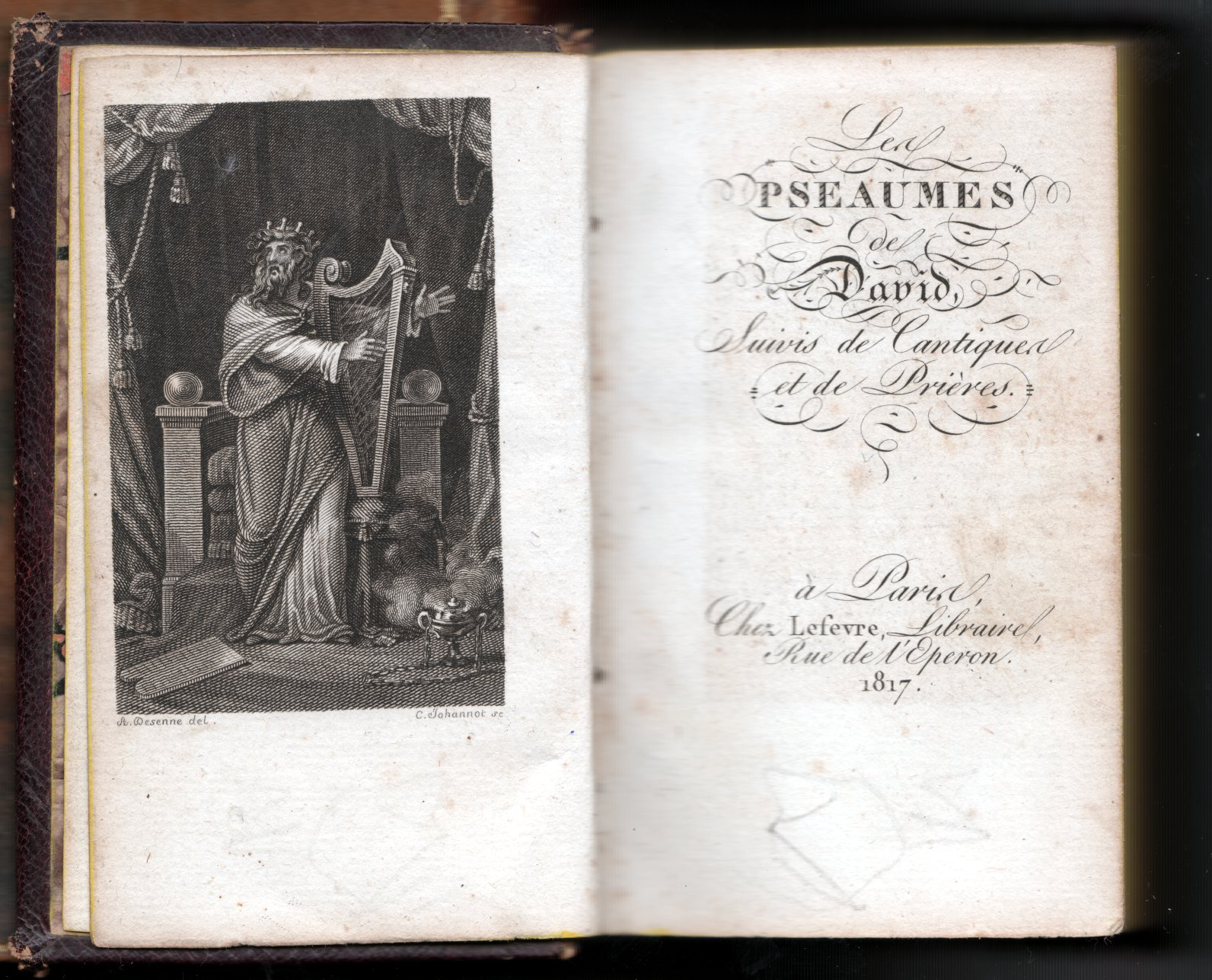
The Protestant psalter, 1817

In 1927 some congregations of EPCAAL branched off and established a separate Evangelical Lutheran church and synod for France and Belgium. Many Evangelical Protestant currents would be established in France in the post-WWII period, many of which are part of charismatic or Pentecostal movements. These movements often succeeded older and smaller movements that were largely indigenous or established through the efforts of European, mainly British, Evangelicals.

=== Apology to the Huguenots ===
In October 1985, to commemorate the tercentenary of the Revocation of the Edict of Nantes, François Mitterrand as president of France formally apologised to the descendants of Huguenots around the world for past governmental persecution of their forebears. At the same time, a special postage stamp was released to honour the Huguenots. In a recognition of sorts of their formerly abused rights, the stamp states that France is the home of the Huguenots ("Accueil des Huguenots").

=== A new rise of Protestantism ===
While Protestantism is declining in much of Lutheran Europe, France may be an exception, where it now is claimed to be stable in number or even growing slightly.

Protestants form a minority of 3% in France. Various churches shaped by Evangelicalism have been the main reason behind the current rise of Protestantism in the country. On the other hand, Calvinists and Lutherans are declining, and in 2013 large parts of these groups merged into the United Protestant Church of France.

In 2019, it was reported that a new Evangelical church is built every 10 days and Evangelicanism now counts 700,000 followers across France.

== See also ==
- Religion in France
- Christianity in France
- Martin Luther
- Jean Calvin
- Virtual Museum of Protestantism
- Conference of Protestant Churches in Latin Countries of Europe
