= St Andrew's Church, Lisbon =

Church in Lisbon, Portugal

Coordinates: 38.7057°N 9.1637°W

St Andrew’s Church
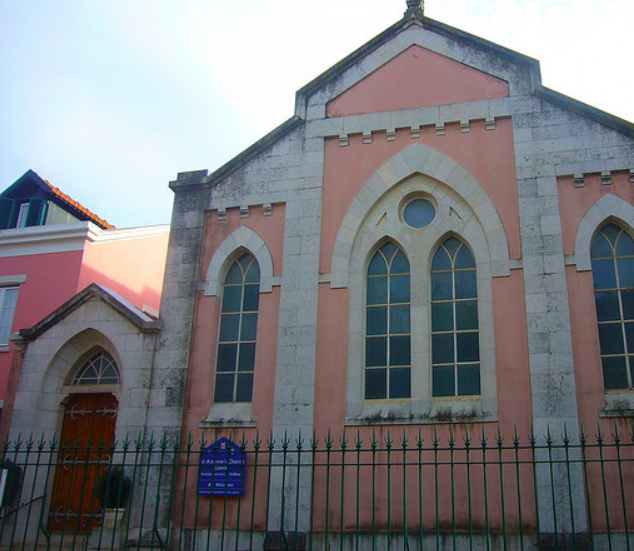
- View of the main façade of the church.

Religion
- Affiliation: Church of Scotland
- District: Lisbon District
- Region: Lisboa Region

Location
- Location: Rua Arriaga 13, 1200-608 Lisbon, Portugal
- Municipality: Lisbon
- Interactive map of St Andrew’s Church

Architecture
- Groundbreaking: 1899
- Completed: 1899

St Andrew's Church is the only congregation of the Church of Scotland in Portugal. It seeks to provide English-speaking Reformed Christian worship and pastoral care to a multinational community.

== About ==
An English-speaking congregation was established in Lisbon by the Free Church of Scotland in 1866; the present church building in Rua Arriaga in the historic Lapa district of Lisbon was constructed in 1899. The Church of Scotland services are conducted in English.

The building is also used by an Orthodox congregation.

The majority of the congregations of the Free Church of Scotland united with the United Presbyterian Church in 1900 creating the United Free Church of Scotland, which itself united with the Church of Scotland in 1929. The congregation was part of the Church of Scotland’s Presbytery of Spain & Portugal, which in 1974 became part of the Presbytery of Europe, which was renamed the International Presbytery in 2016.

== See also ==
- Church of Scotland
- St. George's Church (the Church of England/Anglican congregation in Lisbon)
