= Protestantism in Portugal =

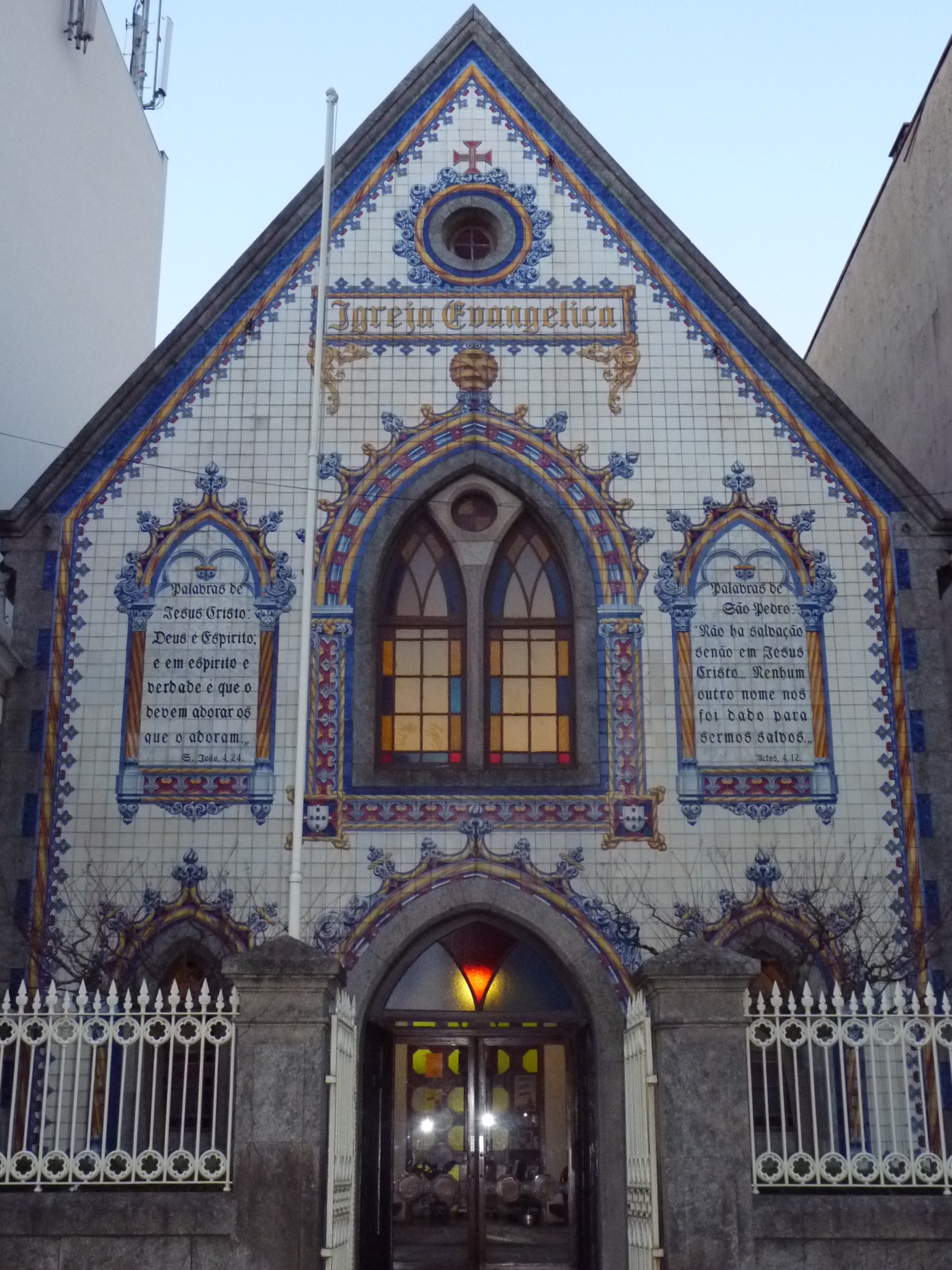
Evangelical Methodist Church of Mirante, the oldest protestant church in Porto

Protestantism in Portugal has long been a minority religion. After the Reformation, the Inquisition and the Portuguese government's religious intolerance outlawed the practice of non-Catholic faiths in the country, and those who followed them could not practice it openly.

However, when the British began settling in Portugal in the 19th century they brought Protestant Christian denominations with them. Most belonged to the Anglican Church of England, but others were Methodists, Congregationalists, Baptists, and Presbyterians.

The establishment of a constitutional monarchy in 1834 granted limited religious toleration to, and consequently led to the opening of an Anglican chapel in Lisbon. A second chapel was opened in 1868. The Anglican mission coincided with the growing influence of the Old Catholic movement in Portugal. Congregations were created from Catholic priests and laypeople who refused to accept the dogmas of the infallibility and universal ordinary jurisdiction of the Pope, as defined by the First Vatican Council in 1870. The Lusitanian Catholic Apostolic Evangelical Church was formed as a result in 1880, however laws still restricted the activities of non-Catholics.

By the early 1990s, only some 50,000 to 60,000 Protestants lived in Portugal, less than 1 percent of the total population. The 1950s and 1960s saw the arrival of Pentecostals who increased in numbers more rapidly than the earlier arrivals did. All groups, however, were hampered by prohibitions and restrictions against the free exercise of their religions, especially missionary activities.

These restrictions were lifted after the Revolution of 1974. The constitution of 1976 guarantees all religions the right to practice their faith. Non-Catholic groups came to be recognized as legal entities with the right to assemble. Portuguese who were both not Catholics and were conscientious objectors had the right to apply for alternative military service.

== Denominations ==
=== Lusitanian Catholic Apostolic Evangelical Church ===
The Lusitanian Catholic Apostolic Evangelical Church is the oldest protestant denomination in Portugal, and is a member church of the Anglican Communion and of the Porvoo Communion. In 2016, research published in the Journal of Anglican Studies, by Cambridge University Press, reported that the church claims 5,000 total members. In 2017, Growth and Decline in the Anglican Communion: 1980 to the Present, published by Routledge, collected peer-reviewed research, edited by faculty at Durham University, reporting there were 2,700 Anglicans in Portugal, a decline from 4,500 in 1970.

=== Evangelical Presbyterian Church in Portugal ===
The Evangelical Presbyterian Church in Portugal is the oldest non-Catholic, non-Anglican church in Portugal.

=== Christian Presbyterian Church of Portugal ===
The Christian Presbyterian Church in Portugal (Igreja Cristã Presbiteriana de Portugal or ICPP in Portuguese) is a small Reformed denomination with relationships with Presbyterian Church in America, the Presbyterian Church of Brazil, the Presbyterian Church in Ireland and the Conservative Presbyterian Church in Brazil. The denomination accepts the five points of Calvinism, the Westminster Confession of Faith and its shorter and larger catechisms.

The denomination was officially formed in 1992, but includes older churches such as the Independent Church in Barreiro (founded in 1955) and the Evangelical Presbyterian Church of Christ (founded in 1970) as well as an independent Presbyterian church in Campo de Ourique in Lisbon, and by a church in northeast Porto planted by a Brazilian missionary.

In 2014 the ICPP celebrated its 30th anniversary.

== See also ==
- Religion in Portugal
- Conference of Protestant Churches in Latin Countries of Europe
