= Lusitanian Catholic Apostolic Evangelical Church =

Anglican Communion church in Portugal

- Igreja Lusitana Católica Apostólica Evangélica
- Seal of Lusitanian Catholic Apostolic Evangelical Church
- Abbreviation: LCAEC
- Classification: Christian
- Orientation: Anglican
- Scripture: Holy Bible
- Theology: Anglican doctrine
- Polity: Episcopal
- Bishop: Jorge Pina Cabral
- Extra-provincial church: Portuguese extra-provincial church within Anglican communion
- Associations: Anglican Communion
- Region: Portugal
- Members: 2,700 - 5,000
- Official website: Official Website

The Lusitanian Catholic Apostolic Evangelical Church (Portuguese: Igreja Lusitana Católica Apostólica Evangélica) is a Christian denomination in Portugal.

The denomination is a member church of the Anglican Communion.

== History ==
It was established in 1880 thanks to the efforts of Church of England and Episcopal clergy passing through Lisbon in 1839 and 1868 and of Roman Catholic laypeople and clergy who rejected the dogmas of the First Vatican Council (1869-1870). It initially adopted a translation of the 1662 Book of Common Prayer.

Assistance from the Episcopal Church continued in the church's early years, along with aid from a council of bishops presided over by William Plunket, then Bishop of Meath in Ireland. The first Portuguese bishop was consecrated in 1958 and full integration occurred in 1980, when the church became an extra-provincial diocese under the authority of the Archbishop of Canterbury.

=== Bishops ===
1. Henrique Riley (1880) - president of the first synod
2. Joaquim Santos Figueiredo (1922) - never consecrated
3. António Ferreira Fiandor (1958-1961) -first bishop to be consecrated
4. Luís Rodrigues Pereira (1962-1979)
5. Fernando da Luz Soares (1980-2013)
6. José Jorge Tavares de Pina Cabral (2013-)

== Organisation ==
Its website states that it consists of two archdioceses (the northern based in Porto and the southern in Lisbon), with between them a total of fourteen parishes and one mission.

== Membership ==
The church reports to the World Council of Churches that it has around 5,000 members. In 2016, research published in the Journal of Anglican Studies, by Cambridge University Press, reported that the church claims 5,000 total members. In 2017, Growth and Decline in the Anglican Communion: 1980 to the Present, published by Routledge, collected peer-reviewed research, edited by faculty at Durham University, reporting there were 2,700 Anglicans in Portugal, a decline from 4,500 in 1970.

== Worship and liturgy ==
In the early days of the church, a translation into Portuguese from 1849 of the 1662 edition of the Book of Common Prayer was used. In 1884 the church published its own prayer book based on the Anglican prayer books, Roman Rite, and Mozarabic liturgies. The intent was to emulate the customs of the primitive apostolic church.

== See also ==
- St Paul's Cathedral, Lisbon — seat of the Lusitanian Church
- Protestantism in Portugal
