= Pircher =

Pircher is a surname. Notable people with the surname include:

- Gerhard Pircher, Austrian luger
- Josef Pircher, founder of Pircher Oberland
- Marc Pircher, musician
- Olga Pircher (born 1952), Austrian politician
- Patrick Pircher (born 1982), Austrian footballer

== See also ==
- Bircher (surname)
- Pitcher (surname)
