= Pitcher (disambiguation) =

A pitcher is a playing position in the game of baseball or softball.

Pitcher or pitchers may also refer to:

== General ==
- Pitcher (container), a container for fluids
- Pitcher (surname), a surname
- Pitchers (ceramic material), scrap ceramic material
- Pitcher plant, one of a type of carnivorous plants
- a slang term for an individual who takes the dominant or penetrative role in sexual intercourse, especially between two men
- a fungicide, used by farmers to protect their crops against molds and rots

== Places ==
- Pitcher, New York, a town
- Pitcher Township, Cherokee County, Iowa
- Pitcher Mountain, a summit in New Hampshire

== Other ==
- TVF Pitchers, a web-series created by The Viral Fever.

== See also ==
- Picher (disambiguation)
