= Governess =

Woman employed as a teacher in a private household

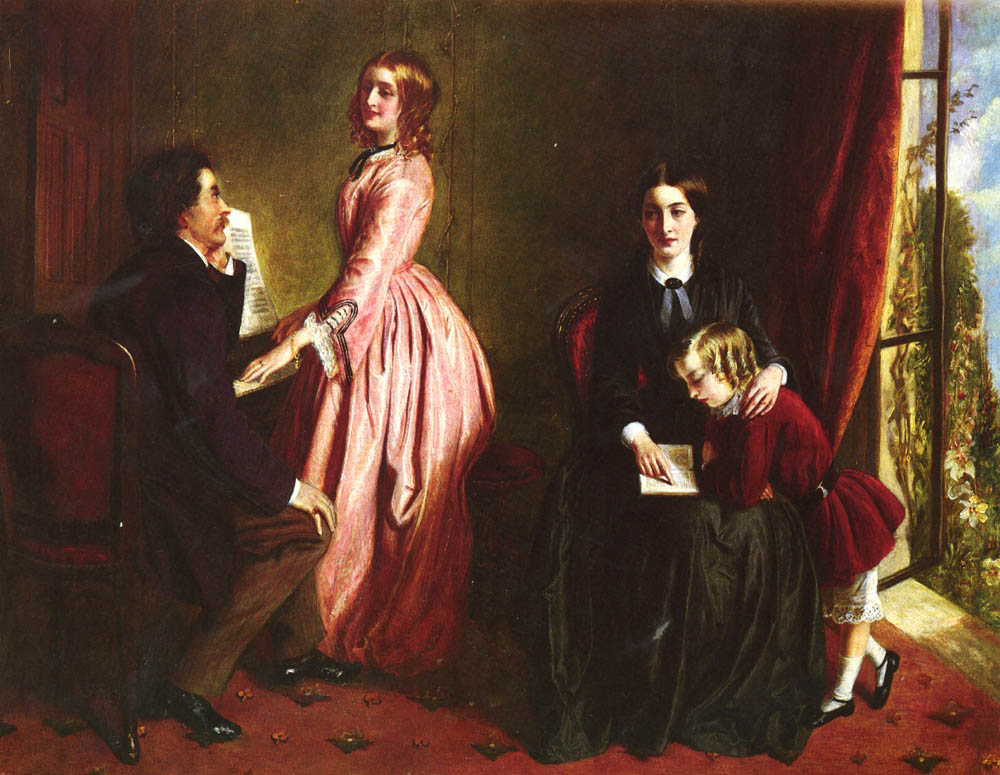
In Rebecca Solomon's 1851 painting The Governess, the title figure (seated right, with her charge) exhibits the modest dress and deportment appropriate to her quasi-invisible role in the Victorian household.

A governess is a woman employed as a private tutor, who teaches and trains a child or children in their home. A governess often lives in the same residence as the children she is teaching; depending on terms of their employment, they may or may not fulfill the limited role of an au pair, cook, and/or maid as a secondary function. In contrast to a nanny, the primary role of a governess is teaching, rather than meeting the physical needs of children; hence a governess is usually in charge of school-aged children, rather than babies.

The position of governess was common in affluent European families before the First World War, especially in the countryside where no suitable school existed nearby and when parents preferred to educate their children at home rather than send them away to boarding school for months at a time. Governesses were usually in charge of girls and younger boys. When a boy was old enough, he left his governess for a male tutor or a school.

Governesses have declined in number, except within large and wealthy households or royal families such as the Saudi royal family and in remote regions such as outback Australia. There has been a recent resurgence amongst wealthy families worldwide to employ governesses or full-time tutors. The reasons for this include personal security, the benefits of a tailored education, and the flexibility to travel or live in multiple locations.

== Role ==
Traditionally, governesses taught "the three Rs" (reading, writing, and arithmetic) to young children. They also taught the "accomplishments" expected of upper-class and middle-class women to the young girls under their care, such as French or another language, the piano or another musical instrument, and often painting (usually the more ladylike watercolours, rather than oils) or poetry. It was also possible for other (usually male) teachers with specialist knowledge and skills to be brought in, such as a drawing master or dancing master.

=== In the United Kingdom ===
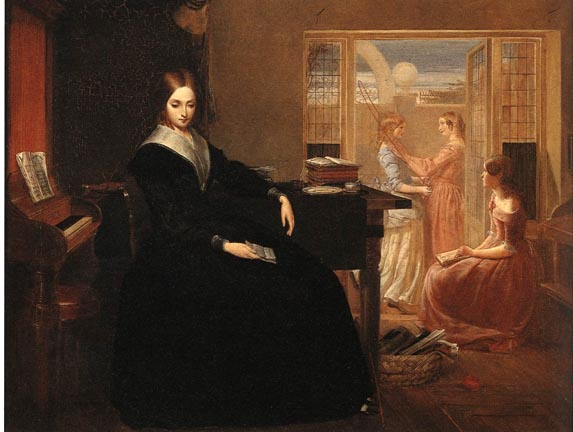
The Governess by Richard Redgrave, 1844

In the Victorian household, the governess was neither a servant nor a member of the host family. She worked in the upper-class home of the landed gentry or aristocracy. She herself had a middle-class background and education, yet was paid for her services. As a sign of this social limbo, she frequently ate on her own, away from both the family and the servants. By definition, a governess was an unmarried woman who lived in someone else's home, which meant that she was subject to their rules. In any case, she had to maintain an impeccable reputation by avoiding anything which could embarrass or offend her employers. If a particular governess was young and beautiful, the lady of the house might well perceive a potential threat to her marriage and enforce the governess's social exclusion more rigorously. As a result of these various restrictions, the lifestyle of the typical Victorian governess was often one of social isolation and solitude.

However, being a governess was one of the few legitimate ways by which an unmarried, middle-class woman could support herself in Victorian society. The majority of governesses were unmarried women whose fortunes had drastically declined following the death or bankruptcy of a male breadwinner. Sarah Bennett is such an example of a woman who became a governess and schoolteacher after her father's building business failed. Bennett was able to retire in her later years. In popular culture, the governess' status was often depicted as one to be pitied, and marriage was considered the only way out of the career. In spite of this, it was difficult for governesses to find suitable partners because most of the eligible men she encountered were her social superiors.

Once a governess's charges grew up, she had to seek a new position, or, exceptionally, might be retained by a grown daughter as a paid companion.

=== British governesses outside the United Kingdom ===
An option for the more adventurous was to find an appointment abroad. There is also some allusion to the phenomenon of governesses being engaged abroad in A galaxy of governesses by Bea Howe.

The Russian Empire proved to be a relatively well-paid option for many. According to Harvey Pitcher in When Miss Emmie was in Russia: English Governesses before, during and after the October Revolution, as many as thousands of English-speaking governesses went there. The estimate of numbers ('thousands'), although necessarily vague, is justified by some knowledge of the main lodging house used by those not accommodated with their host families, St. Andrew's House, Moscow, and by the places of worship they preferentially frequented, for example the church associated with the House. Pitcher drew extensively on the archives of the Governesses' Benevolent Institution in London.

== Notable governesses ==
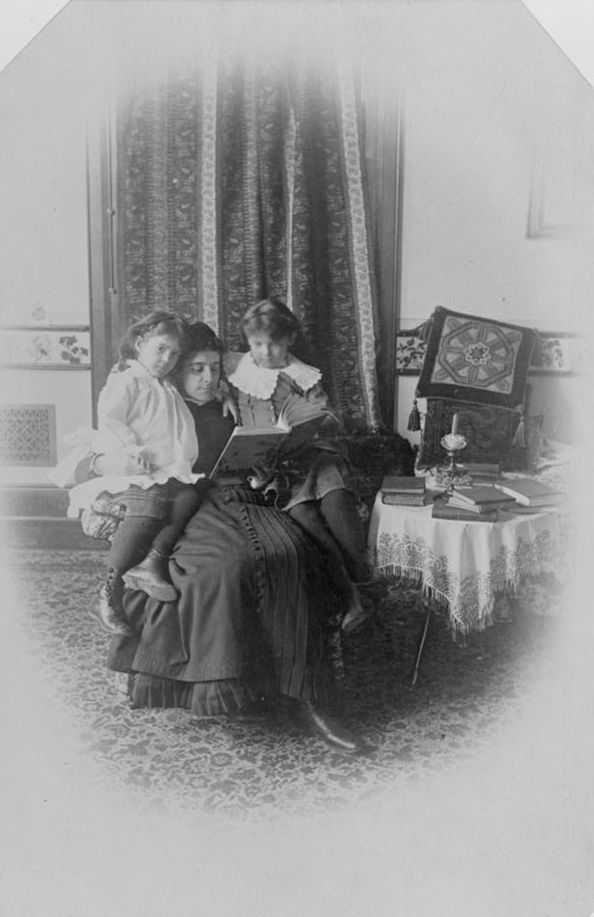
The daughters of Alexander Graham Bell with their governess, c. 1885.

- Katherine Swynford (c. 1350 – 1403), governess to the children of John of Gaunt, became his mistress and the mother of his Beaufort children; after some time, the couple married, and eventually the children were legitimised. She was a great-great grandmother of Henry VII of England through his mother Lady Margaret Beaufort.
- Margaret Pole, Countess of Salisbury (1473–1541), governess to the future Queen Mary I of England. They were also third cousins.
- Kat Ashley (circa 1502 – 1565), governess to Queen Elizabeth I of England.
- Madame de Maintenon (1635–1719), who became the last mistress of Louis XIV of France, gained entry to his inner circle as governess to his illegitimate offspring, the children of Madame de Montespan.
- Jane Gardiner (1758–1840), from her mid-teens governess to the daughters of Lady Martin, and from 1780 to the children of Lord Ilchester. She was succeeded in this second post by Agnes Porter, whose memoirs were reprinted in 1998 as A Governess in the Age of Jane Austen.
- Mary Wollstonecraft (1759–1797), author of the early feminist classic A Vindication of the Rights of Woman, worked as a governess in the household of the Anglo-Irish Kingsborough family, where she greatly influenced Margaret King.
- Maria Flaxman (1768–1833), artist, governess to the children of Georgiana Hare-Naylor and Francis Hare-Naylor while the family lived on the Continent
- Baroness Louise Lehzen (1784–1870) and Charlotte Percy, Duchess of Northumberland (1787–1866), governesses to the future Queen Victoria.
- Anna Brownell Jameson (1794–1860), who became a well-known British writer on a range of subjects including early feminism
- Anna Leonowens (1831–1915), governess to the harem of Mongkut (King of what is now Thailand). Her memoirs were later novelised as Anna and the King of Siam, which in turn inspired the musical drama The King and I.
- Edith Cavell (1865–1915) worked first as a governess before she trained as a nurse
- Anne Sullivan (1866–1936), subject of The Miracle Worker, who educated the remarkable deaf and blind girl Helen Keller.
- Anna Friederich (ca. 1865-1895), who worked as a governess in Prussia and Australia, while writing educational articles and a book in English.
- Maria Curie (1867–1934), who worked as a governess in multiple households to fund her education, later became one of the most influential women in the history of science.
- Maria von Trapp (1905–1987), the real-life inspiration for The Sound of Music.
- Marion Crawford ("Crawfie") (1909–1988), governess of Queen Elizabeth II and Princess Margaret.

== Fictional ==
=== Novels ===
Several well-known works of fiction, particularly in the nineteenth century, have focused on governesses.

- The Governess, or The Little Female Academy (1749) is a collection of short stories for children, by Sarah Fielding
- Jane Austen's novel Emma (1815) opens with the eponymous heroine losing Miss Taylor, the governess who had become a family companion, to marriage with Mr. Weston. Later, Jane Fairfax feels the threat of being forced to become a governess if her covert attachment to Frank Churchill all comes to nothing.
- Mary Martha Sherwood wrote a revised version of The Governess, or The Little Female Academy in 1820.
- Jane Eyre, the protagonist in Charlotte Brontë's novel of that name (1847), serves as a governess to the ward of her future husband, Edward Fairfax Rochester.
- Agnes Grey by Anne Brontë the same year, portrays a more realistic view of what life for a governess was like.
- Becky Sharp, the main character in William Makepeace Thackeray's novel Vanity Fair (1847–48), is employed as a governess.
- Madame de la Rougierre is the wicked and mentally unbalanced French governess to heiress orphan Maud Ruthyn in Joseph Sheridan Le Fanu's gothic novel Uncle Silas (1864).
- Stiva, the brother of the eponymous heroine in Anna Karenina (1878), had an affair with his children's governess.
- Henry James's most famous governess is the over-sensitive and perhaps hysterical protagonist in The Turn of the Screw (1898).
- Two of the Sherlock Holmes stories tell the tales of governesses: Violet Hunter, in "The Adventure of the Copper Beeches", and Violet Smith, in "The Adventure of the Solitary Cyclist". In addition, Mary Morstan, the wife of Dr. John Watson, used to be a governess.
- Dante serves as governess to Stephen Dedalus and his siblings in James Joyce's A Portrait of the Artist as a Young Man (1916).
- In Winifred Watson's novel Miss Pettigrew Lives for a Day (1938), the title character is a life-long governess who unexpectedly finds other employment.
- Patricia Wentworth's Miss Silver series of novels, features Maud Silver as a governess turned private enquiry agent.
- Terry Pratchett's Discworld series features a governess named Susan Sto Helit.
- Eva Ibbotson's children's novel Journey to the River Sea (2001) features Arabella Minton as governess to the main character.
- Michel Faber's historical fiction The Crimson Petal and the White (2002) features a clever woman, Sugar, who climbs improbably from prostitution to governess
- In Libba Bray's Gemma Doyle Trilogy (2003–2007), the title character's orphaned friend is brought up to be a governess.
- Diane Setterfield's gothic suspense novel The Thirteenth Tale (2006) develops parallels with Jane Eyre, including the role of the governess.
- In the Jeanne-Marie Leprince de Beaumont's writing Containing Dialogues between a Governess and Several Young Ladies of Quality Her Scholars, which was published in The Young Misses Magazine, she writes about the polite talks between Ms. Bonne and her class.

=== In film ===
- The Governess is a 1998 British period drama film written and directed by Sandra Goldbacher.
- Maggie Evans/Victoria Winters is hired to be governess to David Collins in the 2012 film Dark Shadows.
- Miss Mary (1986) stars Julie Christie as the eponymous English governess in pre-Peron Argentina.
- The Sound of Music (1965) stars Julie Andrews as Maria von Trapp. Set in Austria in 1938, a young woman studying to become a nun, is sent to become the governess to the seven Trapp children.

=== In television ===
- Soap opera Dark Shadows featured the character Victoria Winters as the governess to David Collins.
- In Star Trek: Voyager, Captain Kathryn Janeway spends recreation time playing the role of a governess, Lucille Davenport, on the holodeck
- The Victorian version of Clara Oswald in the 2012 Doctor Who Christmas special The Snowmen was a governess to Captain Latimer's children.

== Other uses ==
The term "governess" is an archaic gendered job title for a politician; now the word "governor" is used for men or women. For example, Keʻelikōlani was known as the governess of Hawaii.

Anne Hegerty, one of the Chasers on the British and Australian versions of The Chase, is nicknamed "The Governess".

== See also ==
- English Nanny & Governess School
- Home schooling
