= Burcher =

Burcher or Bürcher is a surname. Notable people with the surname include:

- Catherine Wright Burcher (1849–1921), New Zealand artist
- David Burcher (born 1950), rugby player
- Ian Burcher, Australian field hockey player
- Pierre Bürcher (born 1945), bishop

== See also ==
- Burcher, New South Wales, village in New South Wales, Australia
- Bircher (disambiguation)
