= Senator Pitcher =

Senator Pitcher may refer to:

- Fred B. Pitcher (1867–1924), New York State Senate
- Perley A. Pitcher (1877–1939), New York State Senate
