= Pitcher (surname) =

Pitcher is a surname. Notable people with the surname include:

- Annabel Pitcher (born 1982), British children's writer
- Arthur Pitcher (born 1981), Bermudian cricketer
- Azeem Pitcher (born 1980), Bermudian cricketer
- Bill Pitcher (1910–1995), British international motorcycle speedway rider
- Darren Pitcher (1969–2018), English former professional footballer
- Desmond Pitcher (born 1935), English businessman
- Dixon Pitcher, American politician
- Duncan Pitcher (1877–1944), British Indian Army and Royal Air Force officer
- Ernest Pitcher (1888–1946), English recipient of the Victoria Cross during the First World War
- Frank Pitcher (1879–1921), Australian cricketer
- Fred B. Pitcher (1867–1924), New York state senator
- Freddie Pitcher (born 1967), 12th President of Nauru
- Geoff Pitcher (born 1975), English former professional footballer
- George Pitcher (disambiguation)
- Harvey Pitcher (born 1936), English writer, historian and translator
- Helen Pitcher (born 1958), British lawyer and businesswoman
- Henry William Pitcher (1841–1875), English recipient of the Victoria Cross in India
- Justin Pitcher (born 1987), Bermudian cricketer
- Moll Pitcher (c.1736–1813), American clairvoyant and fortune-teller
- Molly Pitcher, nickname given to a woman said to have fought in the American Revolutionary War
- Nathaniel Pitcher (1777–1836), American lawyer and politician, Governor of New York
- Oliver Pitcher (born 1983), Bermudian cricketer
- Perley A. Pitcher (1877–1939), American lawyer and politician, temporary President of the New York State Senate in 1939
- Rebecca Pitcher (born 1972), American actress in the musical theater
- Robert Pitcher (born 1964), English former cricketer
- Thomas Gamble Pitcher (1824–1895), American soldier
- Thomas Pitcher (1745-1837) established a shipyard in Northfleet
- Tony J. Pitcher, Canadian fisheries scientist
- Wallace Spencer Pitcher (1919–2004), British geologist
- William Charles John Pitcher (1858–1925), English artist and costume and scenery designer
- Xander Pitchers (born 1994), Namibian cricketer
- Zina Pitcher (1797–1872), American physician, politician, educator, and academic administrator
