= Mäkipää =

Mäkipää is a Finnish surname. Notable people with the surname include:

- Tea Mäkipää (born 1973), Finnish artist
- Tuomas Mäkipää (born 1978), Finnish Anglican clergyman
- Vesa Mäkipää (born 1965), Finnish ski-orienteer
