= Bircher =

Bircher may refer to:

== People ==
- Bircher (surname)

== Places ==
- Bircher, Herefordshire, a hamlet in England

== See also ==
- Birchers, the John Birch Society
- Burcher (disambiguation)
