= SS Dongola =

Ocean liner and mail ship

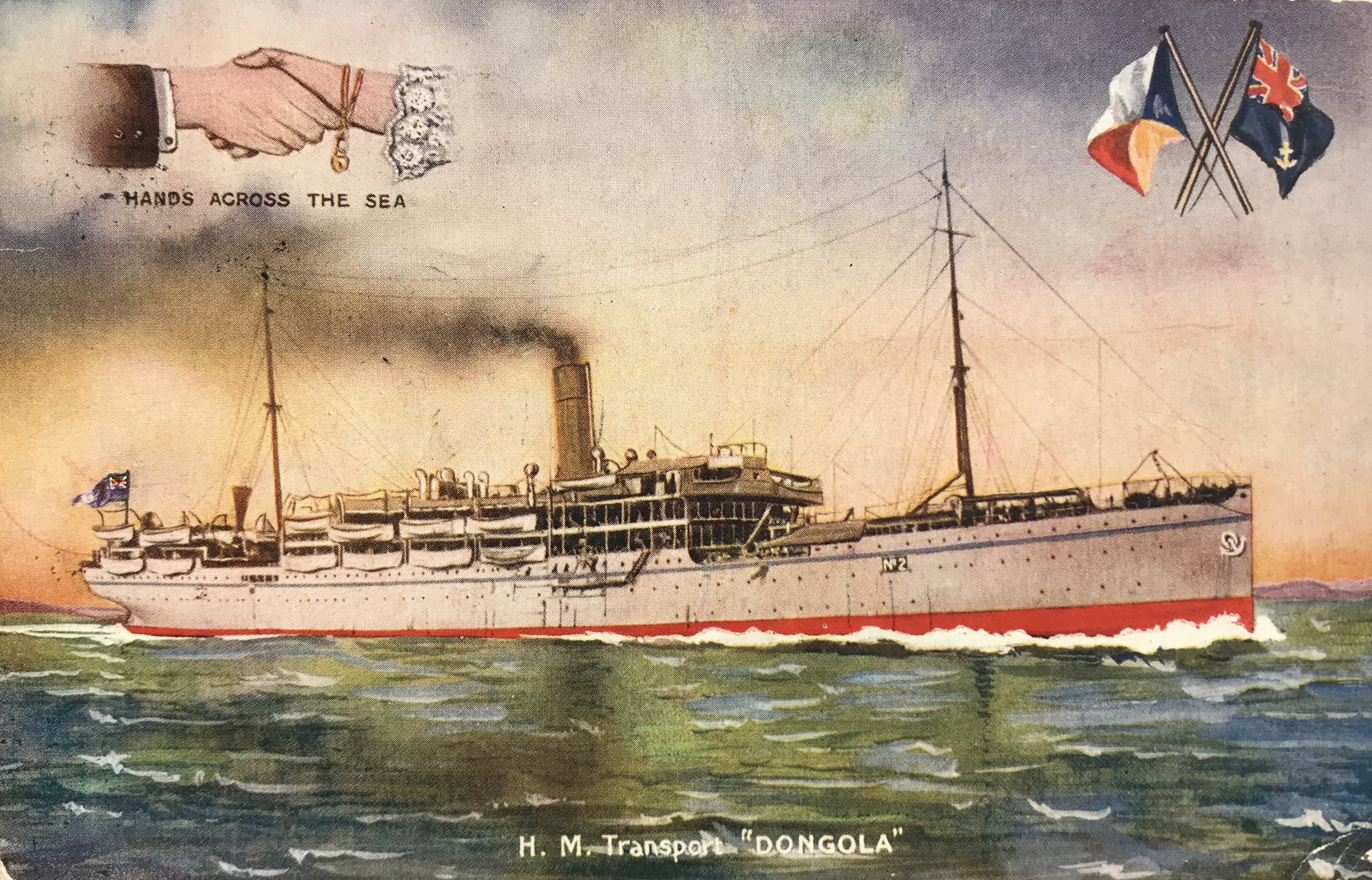
- Dongola about 1913

History

United Kingdom
- Name: Dongola
- Namesake: Dongola
- Owner: P&O
- Operator: 1905: P&O; 1915: Royal Navy
- Port of registry: (United Kingdom) Glasgow
- Builder: Barclay Curle, Whiteinch
- Cost: £160,167
- Yard number: 455
- Launched: 14 September 1905
- Completed: 15 November 1905
- Maiden voyage: November 1905
- Refit: 1919
- Homeport: Southampton
- Identification: UK official number 121270; code letters HDTL; by 1914: call sign MNH
- Fate: scrapped 1926

General characteristics
- Class & type: "D"-class ocean liner
- Tonnage: 8,056 GRT, 4,742 NRT, 8,165 DWT
- Length: 470.0 ft (143.3 m)
- Beam: 56.2 ft (17.1 m)
- Draught: 27.7 ft (8.4 m)
- Depth: 23.2 ft (7.1 m)
- Decks: 3
- Installed power: 1,252 NHP, 8,000 ihp
- Propulsion: 2 × quadruple-expansion engines; 2 × screws
- Speed: 15 1/2 knots (28.7 km/h)
- Capacity: passengers: 163 × 1st class; 80 × 2nd class; cargo: 356,112 cubic feet (10,084 m^{3})
- Crew: 236

SS Dongola, launched 14 September 1905, was a steam-powered ocean liner of the Peninsular and Oriental Steam Navigation Company (P&O), at various times used as a Royal Navy troop ship (HMT Dongola) and hospital ship (HMHS Dongola).

Except during the First World War, the ship's main use was as a passenger liner on the routes from England through the Suez Canal to India and the Far East, and she was fast enough to carry mail.

P&O sold the ship in June 1926 to be broken up for scrap.

== Construction ==
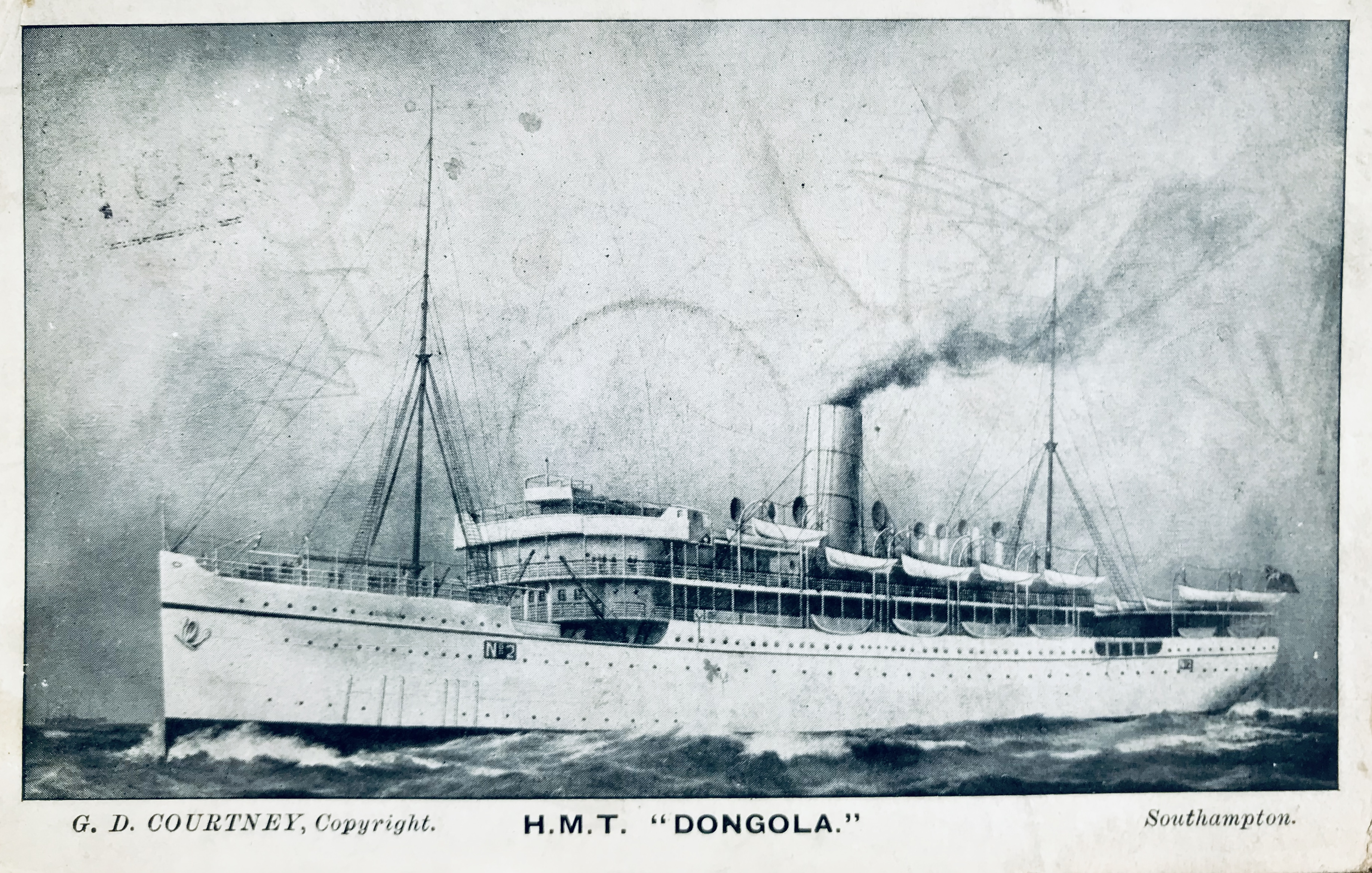
Dongola about 1906

Dongola was ordered by P&O from the shipbuilders Barclay, Curle and Co. of Whiteinch on the River Clyde, and work was reported to be in hand in March 1905. She was one of four ships built in 1905 and 1906 called the "D" class, the others being Delhi, Devanha, and Delta. The ship was launched on Thursday, 14 September 1905, and named Dongola in memory of an Anglo-Egyptian victory on 21 September 1896 in the Anglo-Egyptian conquest of Sudan.

The ship's dimensions were: registered length 470.0 ft (143.3 m), beam 56.2 ft (17.1 m), depth 23.2 ft (7.1 m), draught 27 feet 8 inches (8.43 m). Her tonnages were gross register tonnage 8,056; net register tonnage 4,742; deadweight tonnage 8,165. After sea trials and fitting out, she was delivered to her owners on 15 November 1905, at a price of £160,167, equivalent to £21,724,494 in 2023.

Dongola was a twin-screw steamer with two quadruple-expansion engines, also built by Barclay, Curle. They were rated at 1,252 nominal horsepower or 8,000 indicated horsepower, and gave her a top speed of 15.5 knots. As built, she had berths for 243 passengers: 163 in First Class and 80 in Second Class, and had a cargo capacity of 356,112 cubic feet (10,084 m^{3}).

The ship was designed to be crewed by 236 officers and men, 61 on deck, 91 in the engine room, and 84 in the purser's department.

Dongola was registered at Glasgow. Her UK official number was 121270 and her code letters were HDTL. By 1914 she was equipped for wireless telegraphy. Her call sign was MNH.

== Early years ==
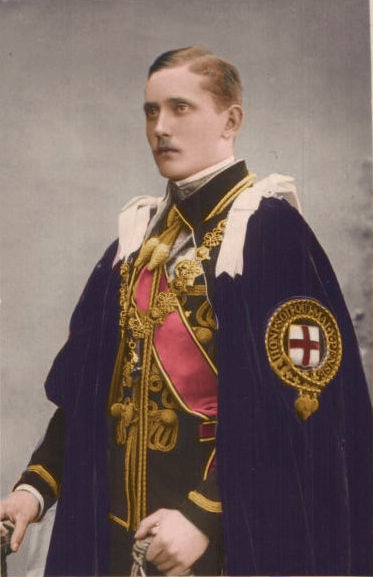
Prince Arthur of Connaught, passenger on maiden voyage

In November 1905, P&O advertised "Direct China Sailings by new Twin Screw Mail Steamer Dongola", stopping in Egypt, Bombay, and Ceylon, with her final destination being Hong Kong. On her maiden voyage beginning at the end of that year, the ship took Prince Arthur of Connaught and his party to China, on their way to Japan to invest the Emperor Meiji with the Order of the Garter. The ship and the prince arrived in Hong Kong on 9 February 1906. Dongola steamed across Hong Kong Harbour accompanied by a procession of gaily decorated launches, and the prince landed at Blake Pier, where there were speeches.

Review of the Fleet, June 1911, in which Dongola took part

Having been designed as a seasonal troop ship, in July 1906 the ship was first taken up by the Admiralty on a summer trooping charter. In 1907, she made a record speed from Southampton to Bombay, completing the voyage in eighteen days and seven hours. Seasonal trooping work was repeated every year until 1910, and in June 1911 the ship took part in King George V's Coronation Review of the Fleet, carrying Admiralty guests. Also in 1911, Dongola was used for Indian famine relief.

Trooping charter work was repeated every summer from 1912 to 1914.

== Wartime hospital and troop ship ==
The ship was under charter and carrying troops when the British Empire declared war on Germany on 4 August 1914.

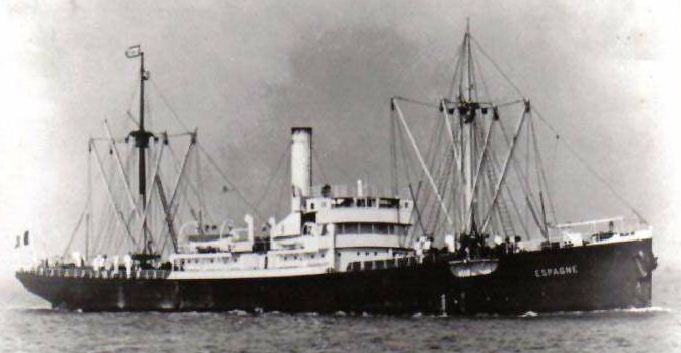
Espagne, rammed by Dongola in 1915

At 10.47 pm on 4 March 1915, Dongola sailed from Avonmouth, and at 00.17 on 5 March she collided with the Belgian steamer Espagne, which was lying at anchor in the Bristol Channel. With a hole below the waterline, on the starboard side at the bow, Dongola was taking in water and was beached near Barry, South Wales, for the hole to be patched. At 4.48 am, the rising tide began to lift the ship, and she was winched into Barry Docks at about 8 am. On 17 March, she steamed back to sea, after repairs.

In 1915, Dongola was requisitioned until further notice and served as a temporary hospital ship in the Dardanelles during the Gallipoli campaign of 1915 to 1916. She then returned to use as a troop transport, largely along the coast of East Africa.

== Baltic voyages ==
In 1919, Dongola remained requisitioned.

The fighting with Germany had been ended by the Armistice of 11 November 1918, but throughout 1919 the Russian Civil War continued to rage, with some British (and Allied) intervention on behalf of the Whites. There was a state of undeclared war between Britain and the Bolsheviks, but in November 1919 Lloyd George began a process of coming to terms with the Soviet Union, and negotiations began in Copenhagen between the British and the Soviets. One of the issues was an exchange of prisoners and others wishing to return home, and an Agreement to this end was signed on 12 February 1920.

Dongola was used to repatriate Russians from Great Britain to Reval in the Baltic, some of whom were being deported, and on 14 May 1920 she went on to Helsingfors in Finland to bring back people escaping from the Russian Civil War. On 18 May, the ship arrived in Copenhagen, and the British press reported that she had on board 356 passengers released from Russia, some two hundred of them British subjects, including fifteen officers, together with 117 French civilians and 27 Danes. The press was silent about several Russians also on board the ship.

The ship arrived at Southampton on 22 May 1920. Those on board included the Rev. F. W. North, Anglican Chaplain in Moscow and his wife, the Russian jeweller Alexander Julius Fabergé, the eight-year-old half-British Dimitry Tolstoy, accompanied by his nurse, Lucy Stark, and Elijah Egmore, a butler. At Copenhagen, Dongola had taken on board several new passengers.

== Return to P&O ==
After her Baltic journeys, Dongola was returned to P&O and was refitted for commercial work. In October 1920 she made her first such voyage from the Port of London to Bombay.

On 20 May 1922, the ship had a severe collision at speed in fog off Woosung, China with the Japanese ship Kumana Maru, whose officers were blamed for the incident. Dongola was beached but Kumana Maru continued her voyage. Both vessels had to go into dock for repairs.

== Earthquake at Yokohama ==
On 28 August 1923, Dongola arrived in Yokohama and was due to leave on 7 September. On 1 September, she was anchored in the Inner Harbour when the Great Kantō earthquake occurred, which destroyed most of the city.

Dongola's master Commander R. H. Griffin RNR, later reported to P&O in London:

At 11.55 a.m. ship commenced to tremble and vibrate violently and on looking towards the shore it was seen that a terrible earthquake was taking place, buildings were collapsing in all directions and in a few minutes nothing could be seen for clouds of dust. When these cleared away fire could be seen starting in many directions and in half an hour the whole city was in flames. The wind which had been force 5 at 11.0 a.m. rapidly increased to force 8, direction S.S.W., the smoke and heat blown directly over the ships in the harbour was intense.

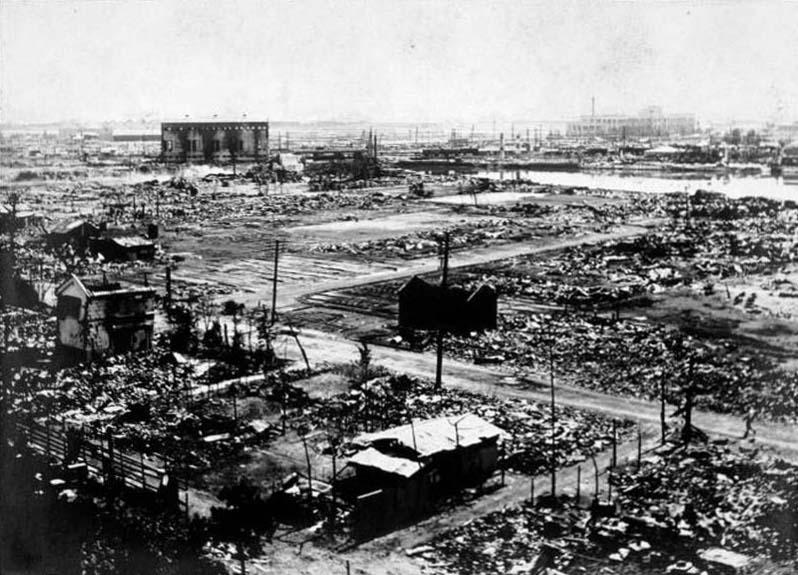
Yokohama after the earthquake

A large ship, the Lyons Maru, passed Dongola heading for open water and touched her bow plates, but did no damage. A burning lighter then hit the ship and sank, and about twelve of the crew were hauled on board, with another twelve drowning. By 5 p.m. the wind had died away and three boats were sent out to rescue survivors. They made several trips until after midnight, picking up more than 250 people, some badly injured. At daylight the boats were sent off again and more survivors rescued.

By 9.40 a.m. on 2 September Griffin was worried by "large quantities of floating oil blazing furiously and drifting in various parts of the harbour", so he took his ship outside the breakwater. A steam launch then came out with more survivors. By 7 p.m. about 600 were on board, mainly Japanese, Russians, and Chinese. Some were transferred to other ships, and Dongola then steamed to Kobe with 505 passengers on board. One woman and one child died on the voyage and were buried at sea.

The larger and newer Canadian Pacific liner RMS Empress of Australia had also been in Yokohama harbour at the time of the earthquake, and her captain recorded in the ship's log: "The vessel shook all over in a most terrifying fashion, and also rocked very quickly and violently until it seemed as though the masts and funnels must carry away." A long wharf beside the ship simply vanished. Empress of Australia also rescued many survivors.

On 5 September, the British press reported that Dongola and all of her crew were safe and had taken aboard many injured and homeless. On 28 December 1923, Commander Griffin was appointed OBE, and the master of the Empress of Australia, already an OBE, was promoted to CBE. Griffin also received a Japanese decoration.

== Final years ==
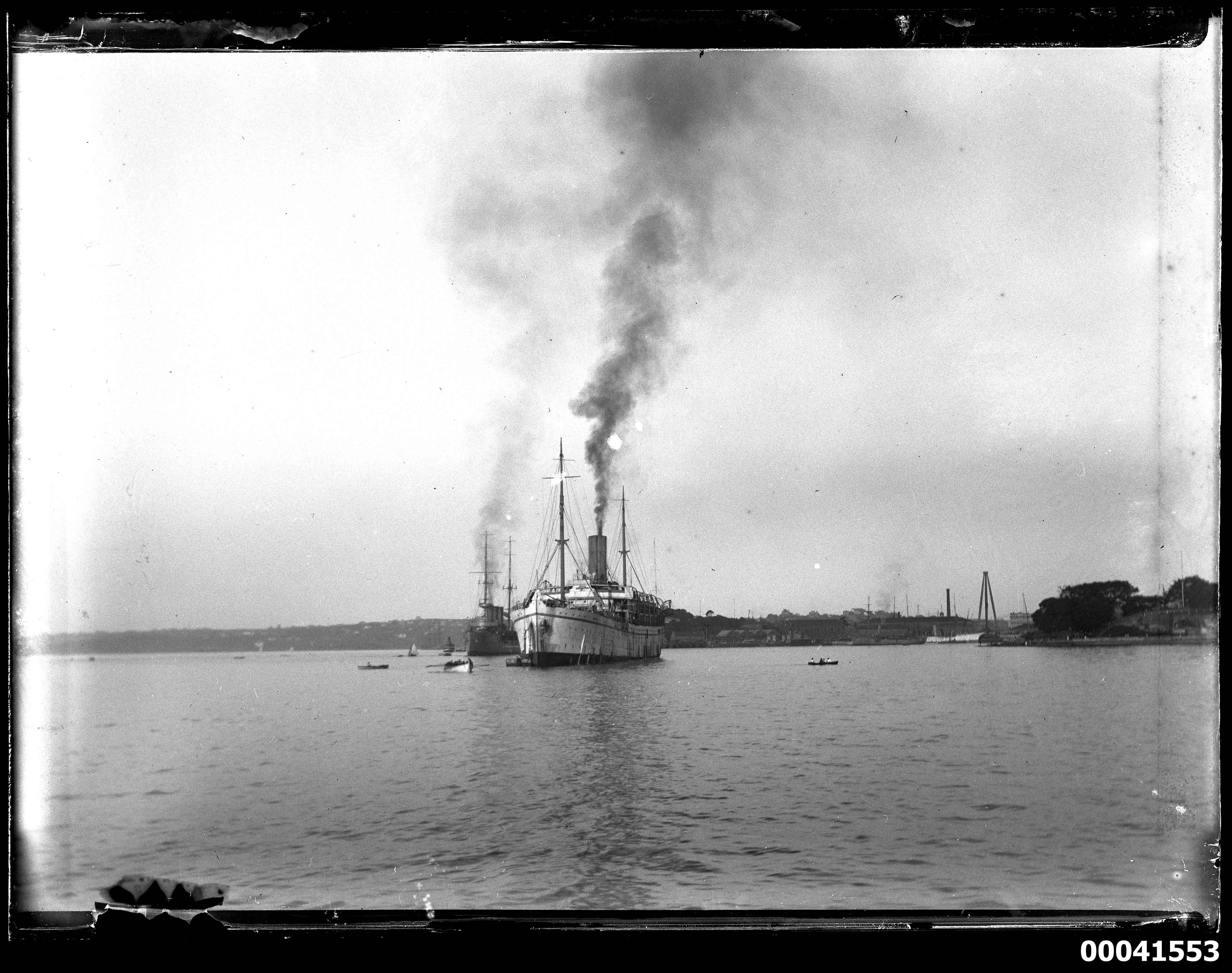
Dongola in Farm Cove, NSW, Australia, 1925

In 1924, Dongola was providing a passenger service between Aden and Bombay, and in 1925 made a round trip from England to Australia and back.

On 28 June 1926, P&O sold the ship to Thos. W. Ward Ltd. for demolition at Barrow-in-Furness, the price paid being £15,500.
