= SS Delhi =

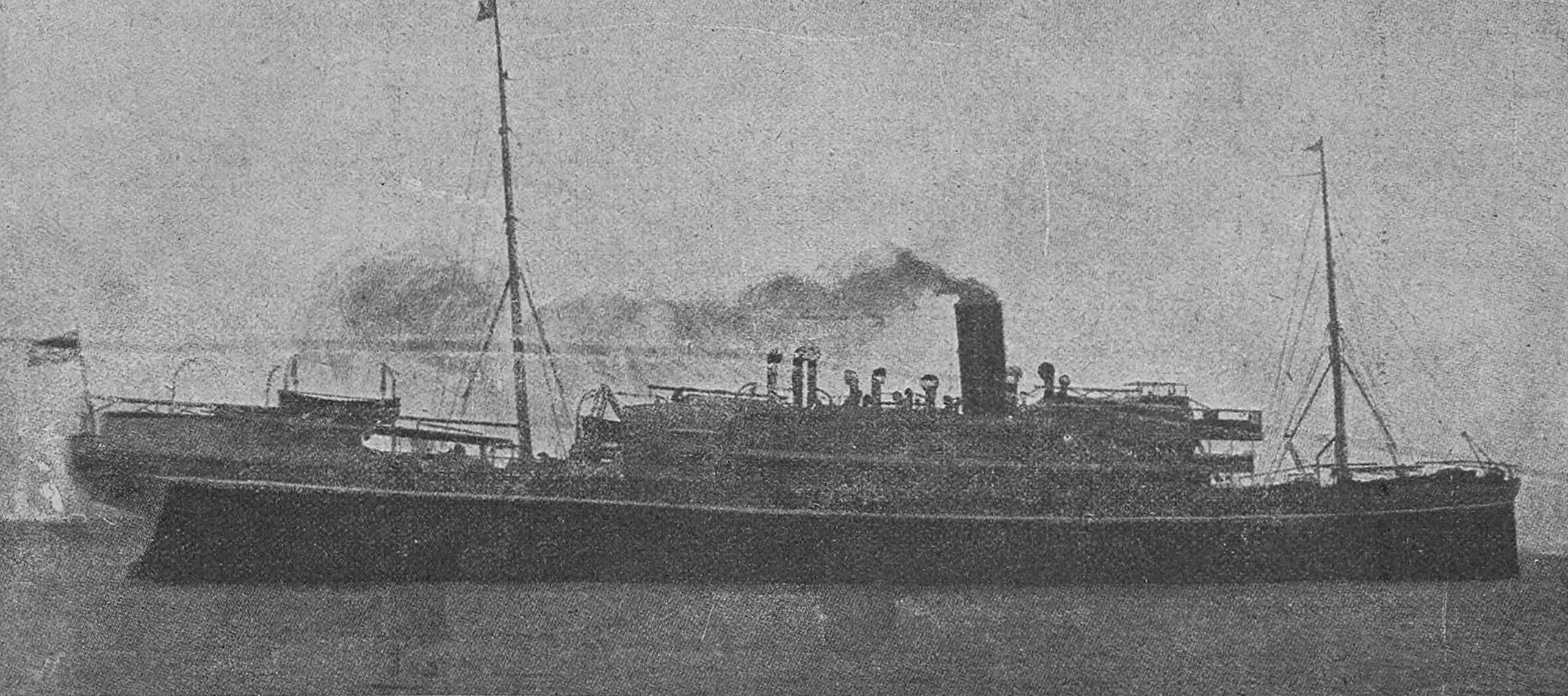

History

United Kingdom
- Name: SS Delhi
- Owner: Peninsular & Orient Line
- Port of registry: London
- Builder: Caird & Company, Greenock
- Yard number: 307
- Launched: 14 October 1905
- Fate: Sunk, 13 December 1911

General characteristics
- Type: Passenger-cargo vessel
- Tonnage: 8,090 GRT
- Length: 470 ft (140 m)
- Beam: 56 ft (17 m)
- Propulsion: Quadruple expansion steam engine
- Capacity: 243 passengers: 163 first class; 80 second class

SS Delhi was a steamship of the Peninsular & Orient Line (P&O) that was lost off Cape Spartel, northern Morocco, at the entrance to the Strait of Gibraltar, on 12 December 1911. Among the passengers was Alexander Duff, 1st Duke of Fife, whose subsequent death in Egypt was ascribed to ill-health caused during the wreck, and his family, the Princess Royal and daughters Princesses Alexandra and Maud.

Delhi was a modern ship, built in 1905–1906 by Caird & Company, of Greenock, one of a class of four ships (Delta, Devanha and Dongola). She measured 8090 gross register tons and had a capacity of 163 first-class and 80 second-class passengers.

The ship, carrying a hundred passengers, ran aground in fog and heavy seas and her lifeboats were smashed. The grounding occurred at 1 a.m. on 13 December 1911 two miles south of Cape Spartel. In addition to the full list of passengers the ship carried cargo valued at approximately one million sterling. Three warships, the French cruiser Friant and later the British battleship HMS London and cruiser HMS Duke of Edinburgh responded to the Delhi's distress calls, made by Wireless. The British ships were late in responding due to an order that the naval station at Gibraltar was not to take notice of commercial message traffic with Friant being first to respond. The Gibraltar lifeboat also assisted, with the Captain of the Port, Commander William Niles as volunteer coxswain (Niles had had previous experience as coxswain on Cardigan lifeboat).

With waves breaking over the decks of the stranded ship ship's boats from the warships ferried survivors to shore or to the warships, taking five days to complete the rescue. The bad weather made the rescue difficult and at least one British boat capsized and the Gibraltar lifeboat was stove in and became half full of water; three French sailors were lost in a separate rescue attempt.

On 23 February 1912 the Board of Trade enquiry found the ship had not been navigated properly and charts provided were five years out of date with the sailing directions ten years out of date with the fault being with the master. The primary cause was determined to be the master's overconfidence in a dead reckoning position of 11:30 p.m. and an alteration of course based on that position just before the 1:00 a.m. stranding with failure to take soundings. The board, with respect to the master's long service and performance during the rescue, did not address his certificate but did exonerate the fourth officer and expressed gratitude to the crew of the Friant. Previously the Chairman of P&O had written a letter of gratitude to the French Navy for the service of the crew of the French warship and contributed £500 toward a fund for families of the three men from that ship lost in the rescue.

Several awards of The Board of Trade Medal for Saving Life at Sea, in silver, were made including Max Horton, who later commanded the Western Approaches during World War II, Commander William Niles, Rear-Admiral Sir Christopher George Francis Maurice Cradock, KCVO, CB, and Lt Noel Corbett of the London (who also received the Royal Humane Society's silver medal, for the rescue of a seaman washed overboard during the rescue efforts)

== Bibliography ==
- Frank H. Shaw Full Fathom Five: A Book of Famous Shipwrecks New York: The Junior Literary Guild, 1930, p. 16. A photograph of the ship is just after p. 24.
