= Anglican Church in Finland =

Church

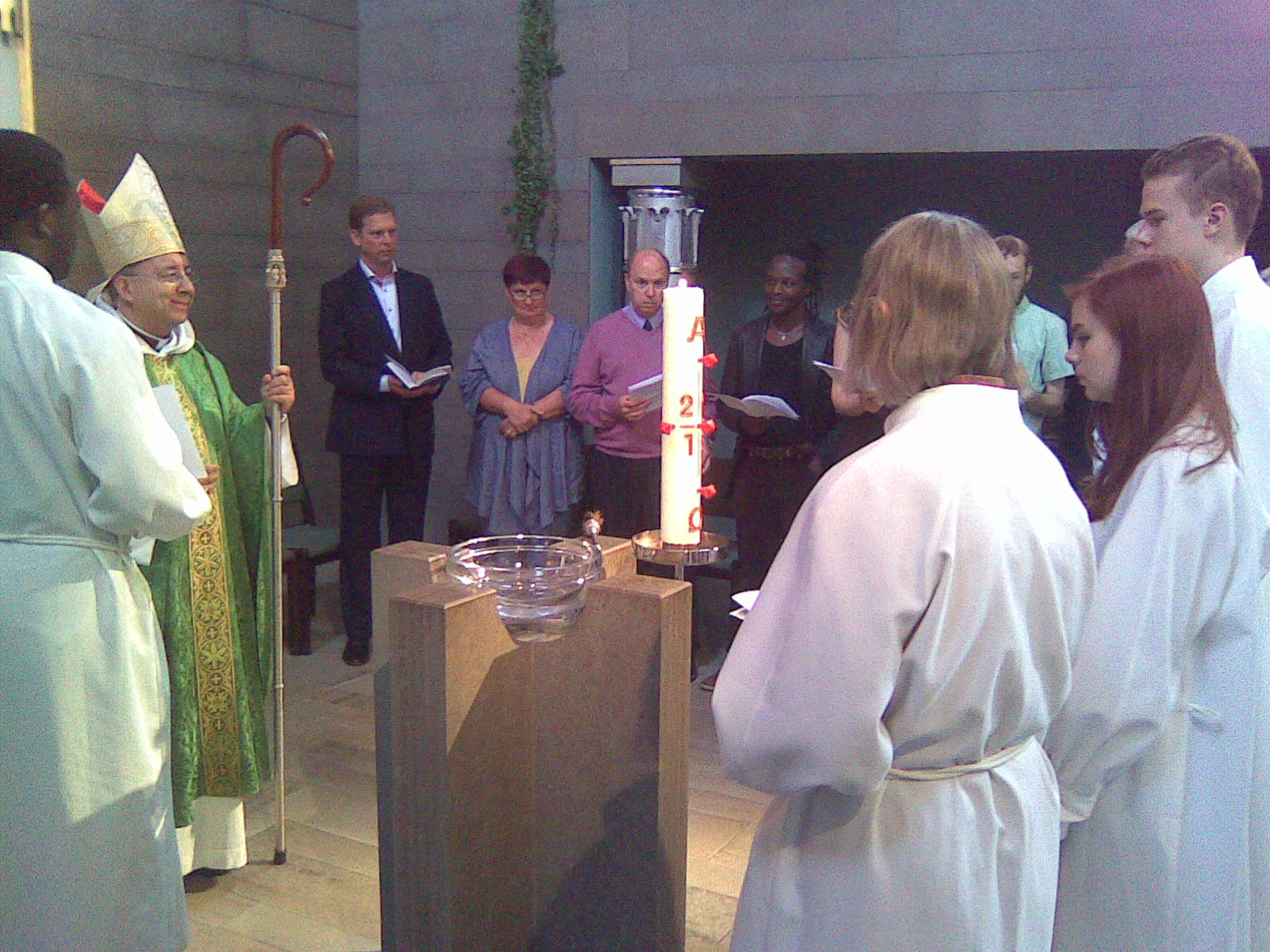
- Anglican confirmation in Helsinki in June 2013
- Classification: Protestant
- Orientation: Anglican
- Scripture: Bible
- Origin: 1920s

The Anglican Church in Finland (Finnish: Suomen Anglikaaninen kirkko; Swedish: Anglikanska kyrkan i Finland) is a church in the Diocese of Gibraltar in Europe in the Church of England. There were 171 registered members at the end of 2016. The church has close links with the Evangelical Lutheran Church of Finland including full communion through the Porvoo Agreement.

The church has its activities in Helsinki as the Chaplaincy of Saint Nicholas at the chapel of the Cathedral and the Church of Mikael Agricola. The Church organises activities also outside Helsinki. In Tampere the church has a community of International Community of Christ the King and Turku Cathedral International Congregation in Turku. In northern Finland, the church has a significant number of Anglicans who arrived from the Sudan as refugees. The church is a member of the Finnish Ecumenical Council.
