= Chaplaincy of Saint Nicholas, Helsinki =

St Nicholas, Helsinki
- Chaplaincy of St Nicholas, Helsinki
- Location: Helsinki
- Country: Finland
- Denomination: Anglicanism
- Website: anglican.fi

History
- Founded: September 24, 1936

Administration
- Province: Province of Canterbury
- Diocese: Diocese of Gibraltar in Europe
- Archdeaconry: Germany and Northern Europe
- Deanery: Nordic and Baltic States

The Anglican Chaplaincy of St Nicholas, Helsinki was established by those who fled from Saint Petersburg during the Russian Revolution. They settled first in Vyborg from where they were forced to flee again during the Winter War and stayed in Helsinki, Finland. The Chaplaincy is part of the Church of England's Diocese of Gibraltar in Europe and works closely with the Evangelical Lutheran Church of Finland under the Porvoo Agreement. Since there are now three independent Anglican congregation in Finland, the Chaplaincy has moved from using the name Anglican Church in Finland and is using its official name under the Church of England.

The Chaplaincy is serving Anglicans living in the greater Helsinki area and is an inclusive community of word and sacrament.

Before the Russian Revolution of 1917 the Anglican chaplain at St Petersburg made occasional visits to Helsinki to minister to the English residents there. After the revolution, the chaplain at Moscow moved to Helsinki, where he was appointed to serve the British Legation. In 1921 the Legation ceased to employ the chaplain, and he was subsequently supported by voluntary contributions from the English residents. At various times the chaplain at Helsinki has assumed additional responsibility for Anglicans in Russia, Estonia, Mongolia and China.

== Chaplains of St Nicholas, Helsinki ==
- Frank William North, Chaplain to Helsinki and Moscow (1920 - 1925), He died suddenly in May 1925.
- Clement H. Jones (1925–1936; 1954–1956)
- Rev Newberry (1936 - 1939)
- Sydney Linton (1948–1951), first Chaplain after the Second World War
- Henry Isherwood (1951–1954), Assistant Bishop (Diocese of Gibraltar) 1974
- John Richard Satterthwaite (1956–1957) later Bishop of Gibraltar [later: of Gibraltar in Europe], 1970–1993
- John Coulson Rogers (1960–1962)
- William Mansfield Masters (1962–1966)
- Edward Eric Staples (1966–1980), Chaplain to the Queen 1973
- Michael James Pitts (1981–1985), Dean of Christ Church Cathedral (Montreal) 1991
- Alan Michael Cole (1986–1990)
- Tyler Strand (1990–1993)
- Francis Chadwick (1993–1998)
- Rupert Robert James Moreton (1998–2011)
- Tuomas Mäkipää (2012–2024)
- Maria Obafemi-Onuigbo (2025–)
