= English Nanny & Governess School =

- Other names: ENGS
- Motto: Education Begins at Birth
- Type: Private, non profit
- Established: 1984
- President: Sheilagh Roth
- Location: Chagrin Falls, Ohio, U.S.
- Colors: Turquoise & brown
- Website: www.nanny-governess.com

English Nanny & Governess School (ENGS), founded in 1984 by Sheilagh Roth provides childcare education and training. Its graduates are employed in the United States and around the world as nannies and governesses.

The school was originally located on the campus of Case Western Reserve University, in Cleveland, Ohio. It was relocated to Chagrin Falls, Ohio, in 1992.

The school is licensed by the Ohio State Board of Career Colleges and Schools.

The curriculum consists of a three-month classroom instruction program that is accompanied by an in-home practicum program. Upon completion, graduates are awarded the title of "certified professional nanny" or "certified professional governess", through the American Council of Nanny Schools (ACNS).

== History ==
The school was the first of its kind in America, with a full academic faculty dedicated exclusively to educating nannies and governesses.

The school was invited to represent the child-care and nanny profession at the Conference on Childcare at The White House by the First Lady, Hillary Clinton.

It has appeared in newspaper and magazine articles, including The Times, The New York Times and W, as well as on radio shows and television programs. The television shows include Good Morning America, Fox News, Larry King Live and Nightline.

== Academics ==
The school offers a three-month course in the fields of child growth, behavior and development, experiential education childcare, cultural enrichment and personal protection and safety, as well as professionalism. Students must complete a minimum of 300 course hours.
