= SS Espagne (Anversois, 1909) =

Belgian cargo ship sunk in English Channel

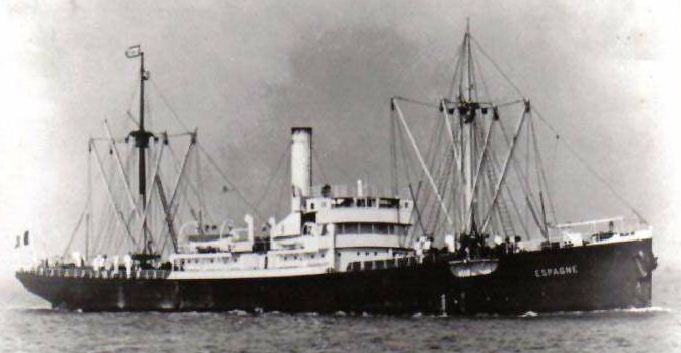
- Espagne

History

Belgium
- Name: Espagne
- Namesake: Spain
- Owner: Armement Adolf Deppe
- Port of registry: Antwerp
- Builder: Chantiers Navals Anversois SA
- Yard number: 40
- Launched: 6 February 1909
- Completed: March 1909
- Identification: code letters MBHL
- Fate: sunk by torpedo, 25 December 1917

General characteristics
- Type: cargo ship
- Tonnage: 1,463 GRT, 1,070 NRT
- Length: 235.5 ft (71.8 m)
- Beam: 36.1 ft (11.0 m)
- Depth: 12.3 ft (3.7 m)
- Decks: 1
- Installed power: 150 NHP
- Propulsion: 1 × triple-expansion engine; 1 × screw
- Crew: 24

SS Espagne was a Belgian cargo ship that was torpedoed by the Imperial German Navy submarine SM UC-71 in the English Channel off St Catherine's Point, Isle of Wight, England, while she was travelling from Le Havre, France to Newport, Wales.

== Construction ==
Espagne was launched on 6 February 1909 with yard number 40 at the Chantiers Navals Anversois shipyard in Hoboken, Antwerp, Belgium. She was completed the following month, having been ordered by the Antwerp shipping company Armement Adolf Deppe.

The ship was 71.78 metres (235 ft 6 in) long, with a beam of 11.00 metres (36 ft 1 in). She had a depth of 3.73 metres (12 ft 3 in).^{[Note 1]} The ship was assessed at 1,463 gross register tons (GRT). She had a triple expansion steam engine driving a single screw propeller. Steam was supplied by two boilers; the engine was rated at 150 nhp. It was made by the North East Marine Engine Co Ltd. Hartlepool, County Durham, United Kingdom. Her crew numbered 24.

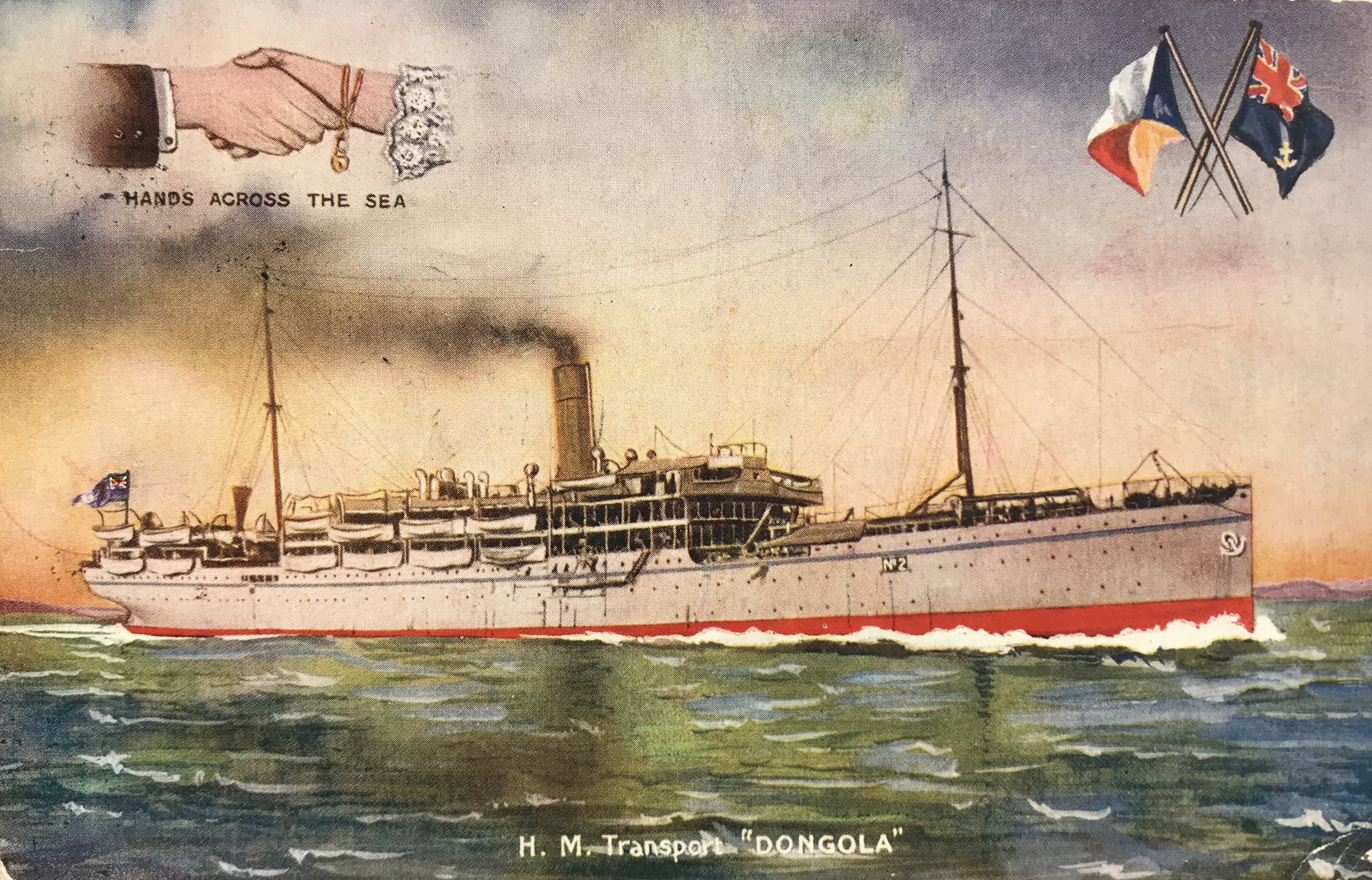
Dongola around 1913

== 1915 incident ==
Espagne was lying at anchor in the Bristol Channel on 5 March 1915, when at 17 minutes past midnight the British passenger liner (in use as a troop ship for the Royal Navy) HMT Dongola inbound from Avonmouth, collided with her. The Dongola was damaged below the waterline and taking on water on the starboard side at the bow.

She was subsequently beached in Porthkerry Bay, west of Barry and was able to patch the damage and temporarily stop the leak. Her passengers were taken off by two Royal Navy patrol ships with the Barry lifeboat being in attendance in case of need. At 4.48 am the rising tide refloated the ship and she was winched into Barry Docks by 8 am. Dongola was repaired and returned to service on 17 March.

== Sinking ==
On 25 December 1917, Espagne was in ballast on a voyage from Le Havre, Seine-Maritime, France to Newport, Monmouthshire, United Kingdom. Espagne was struck by one torpedo from SM UC-71 off St. Catherine's Point, Isle of Wight, United Kingdom (50°26′N 1°29′W). The ship sank to a depth of over 40 metres (130 ft),.

== The wreck ==
The wreck sits 40 to 50 metres (130 to 160 ft) deep at 50°26′30″N 1°29′31″W and is mostly broken. The engine lies on its side and the two boilers one of which stands on one end.

== Notes ==
1. Measurement given in imperial units in source, presented as metric converted to imperial for consistency.

== Bibliography ==
- Lloyd's Register of Shipping. Vol. I.–Steamers. London: Lloyd's Register of Shipping. 1914. ESC–ESP.
