= Frank William North =

The Reverend Frank William North
- Anglican Chaplain of Moscow
- Church: St Andrew's Church, Moscow
- See: Northern and Central Europe
- In office: 1911–1920
- Successor: Church confiscated by RSFSR, 1920, reinstated 1994
- Previous post: Anglican Chaplain of Saint Petersburg

Personal details
- Born: 23 June 1871 Acton, England
- Died: 17 May 1925 (aged 53) Helsinki, Finland

Frank William North (23 June 1871 – 17 May 1925) was a Church of England clergyman who spent most of his career in the countries of Russia and Finland.

Born in Acton, England, North was the son of George William North, a merchant, and his wife Elizabeth Jane. He was baptized into the Church of England at Acton on 25 August 1871. Educated at King's College London, in 1895 he was elected as a Theological Associate of his college.

In June 1895 North was ordained into the ministry of the Church of England and appointed as a curate in the parish of St John's, North Woolwich, and in August 1904, the Dean of Guernsey licensed him to serve St Stephen's Church, Guernsey. In 1905, North was appointed as Chaplain to the Anglican Church in Saint Petersburg, where he remained until 1911. In 1910, in St Petersburg, he married Margaret Caird Birse, the daughter of a Scottish cotton merchant settled in Russia since the 1850s, and their son Herbert Caird North was born on 3 April 1911.

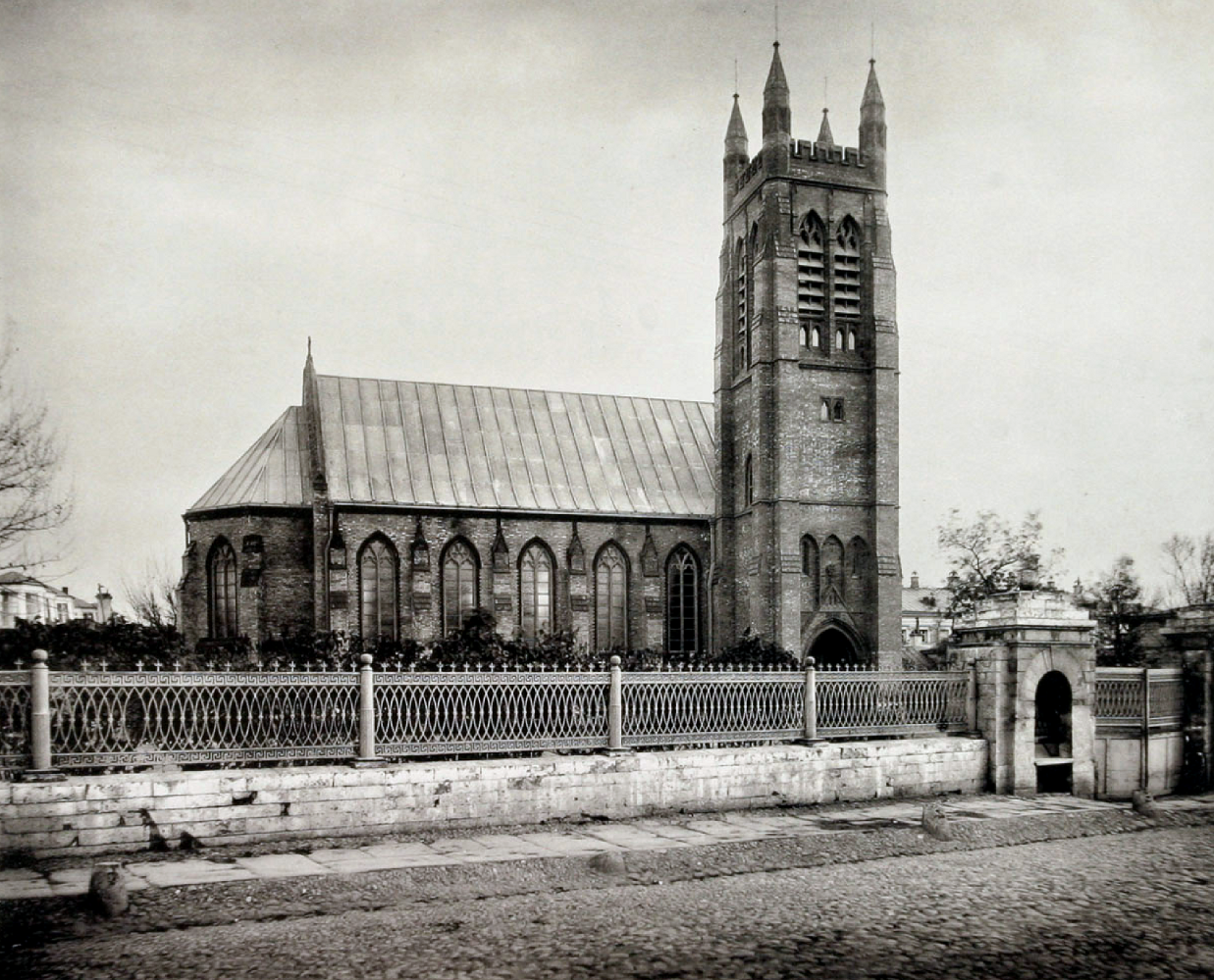
St Andrew's Church, Moscow

From 1911 until 1920, North served as Chaplain of St Andrew's Anglican Church, Moscow, becoming a leader of the English-speaking community there. Early in the First World War, he held a military service in his church, following a march through the main streets of central Moscow, a demonstration of British solidarity with Russia in the wartime Alliance.

After the October Revolution, North came into conflict with the new Soviet authorities. Mrs North's uncle, Edward Birse, a business man in Russia, was an assistant to the British diplomat and agent R. H. Bruce Lockhart at the time of the Revolution.

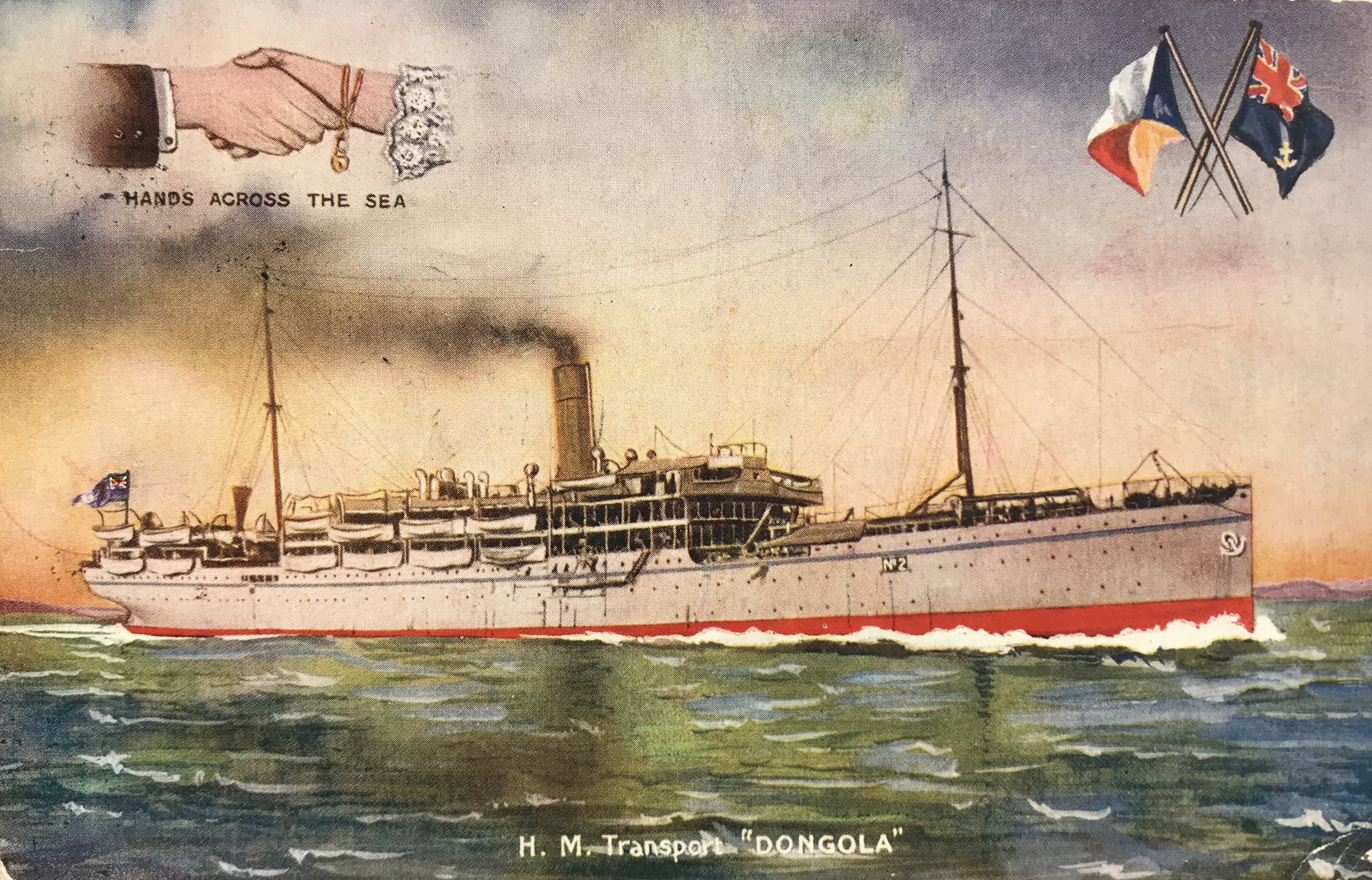
The Dongola

The Soviets made peace with the Central Powers in March 1918, but a Russian Civil War then raged for some years, with British and Allied intervention on behalf of the Whites, meaning there was a state of undeclared war between Britain and the Bolsheviks. In the final months of 1919, North gave all the help he could to a group of Royal Navy sailors, led by Lieutenant L. E. S. Napier, captured during the British campaign in the Baltic and being held at Andronievsky Monastery, which had been converted into a prison. In January 1920, North was given permission to conduct a party of four of them to Finland.

On 12 February 1920, an agreement was signed for an exchange of prisoners and others wishing to return home, and North took on the task of acting as Registrar for the evacuation of British residents. While in the course of this work, in April 1920 he was arrested and interrogated by the Cheka. The evacuation proceeded in May 1920 by the SS Dongola, which took North, his wife, his son, and most of the British subjects in his flock from Helsingfors to Southampton, arriving there on 22 May.

Interviewed on board the ship on his arrival, North gave an account of terrible experiences in Moscow and urged the isolation of the Soviet Union:

If we leave them alone and do not trade with them, I believe that the end of the Soviet rule is bound to come soon. Most of their transport is ruined, and the people are demoralised and refuse to work... It is all one great mad-house.

North reported that apart from the round of daily hardships, life in Moscow had become one of robbery. The Bolsheviks had stolen his church funds, including a fund he held for British people who were destitute in Moscow, and also his silver. Finally, they had stolen Mrs. North's jewels. The other Britons travelling with him had come safely home, determined to overcome any obstacle rather than endure any longer the misgovernment of the Soviets.

On 24 May 1920, The Times published an interview with North, in which he continued his critique of the situation in Russia and his views on the Bolsheviks. The Spectator of 29 May 1920 also carried a story about North's experiences in Russia.

In June 1920, North poured scorn on George Lansbury, who had returned from Moscow with some favourable views of the Bolsheviks. North said that in Moscow Lansbury had been dependent on a Commissar called Joseph Fineberg, of whom he was also very critical. The Morning Post reported North's disagreement with Lansbury and his experience in a Bolshevik jail, of which it said "The facts are too revolting for reproduction".

At the time of the voyage of the Dongola, Margaret North was pregnant, and she gave birth to a daughter, Geraldine, on 22 September 1920.

Within a few months, North and family returned to Finland and settled there, and he was appointed as Anglican Chaplain to Helsingfors. The North family was living at 11, Ostra Brunnsparksalleen, Helsingfors, when North died there on 17 May 1925.

In 1939, Mrs North and her daughter Geraldine were living in Belsize Grove, Hampstead, North London.
