= St. Andrew's Anglican Church, Moscow =

St Andrew's Anglican Church
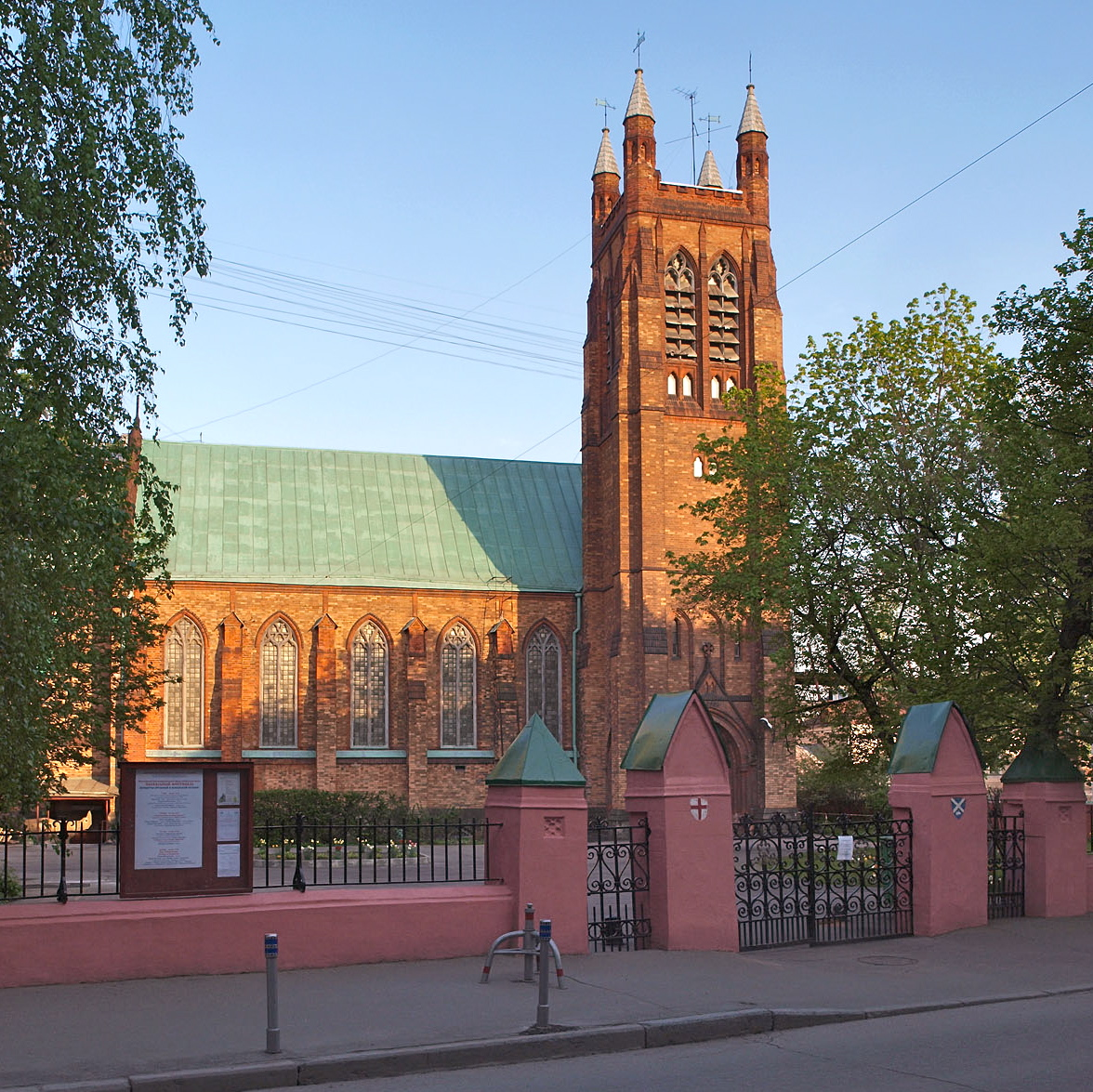
- A view of St Andrew's Anglican Church
- St Andrew's Anglican Church
- 55.7582°N 37.6048°E
- Address: Moscow
- Country: Russia
- Denomination: Anglican
- Website: moscowanglican.org

History
- Status: Church
- Consecrated: 1885

Architecture
- Functional status: Active
- Architect: Richard Knill Freeman
- Architectural type: Church
- Style: Gothic Revival
- Completed: 1884

Specifications
- Materials: Brick

Administration
- Diocese: Europe

St Andrew's Anglican Church in Moscow is the sole Anglican church in Moscow, and one of only two in Russia. It continues the tradition of Anglican worship in Moscow that started in 1553 when Tsar Ivan the Terrible first allowed the English merchants of the Russia Company permission to worship according to their own beliefs. The Russia Company, now operating mainly for charitable purposes, continues to financially support the Anglican Church in Moscow through the congregation of St Andrew's.

The current church building dates from 1883 and the parsonage from 1894. During the October Revolution in 1917 the church tower was used as a machine gun post by the Bolsheviks. The church was confiscated in 1920 and the chaplain expelled from Russia. During Soviet rule the church and parsonage were used as a hostel for girls and to house diplomats from Finland and Estonia. Starting in 1964 the state record company Melodiya used the church as a recording studio. Services returned on 15 July 1991, and during the visit of Queen Elizabeth II on 19 October 1994 the Russian government agreed to return the building to religious use. Melodiya vacated the premises in 2001.

== Early history ==
Some early records are available through the Russia Company archives in London's Guildhall, and from records sent to the Bishop of London.

External videos
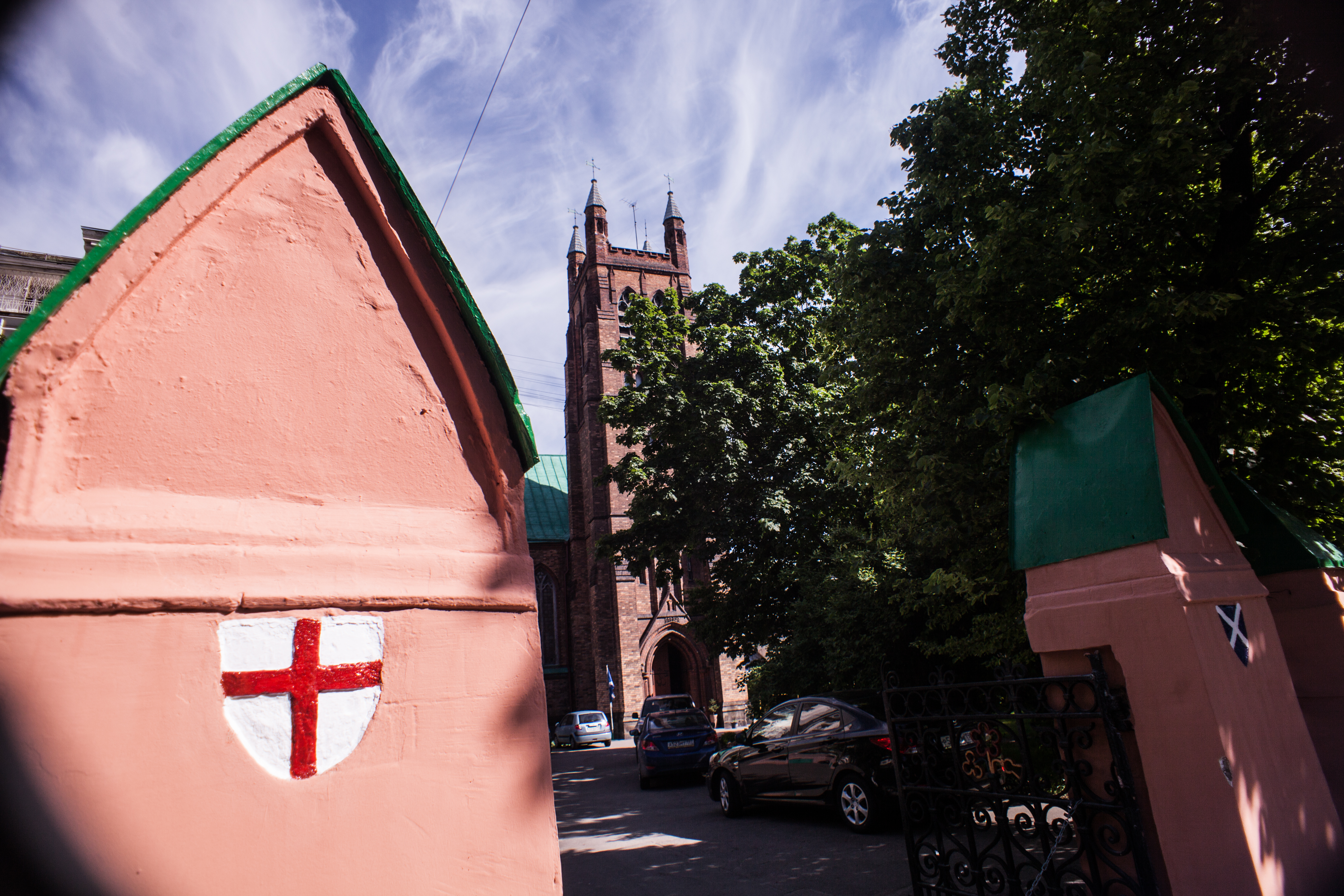
- St Andrews Overview, 6:31, St. Andrews Anglican Church Moscow

The first Anglican worship in Moscow may have been held in the Old English Yard, now on Varvarka Street, the center of the Russia Company in Moscow. The first English church building in Russia was probably built in Arkhangelsk in the 17th century, with its chaplain serving both Arkhangelsk and Moscow from 1705. In 1754, with most foreigners in Russia residing in the new capital, St. Petersburg, the Moscow congregation was served by the chaplain from St. Petersburg. Services were probably held in the Reformed Church in Moscow's German Quarter.

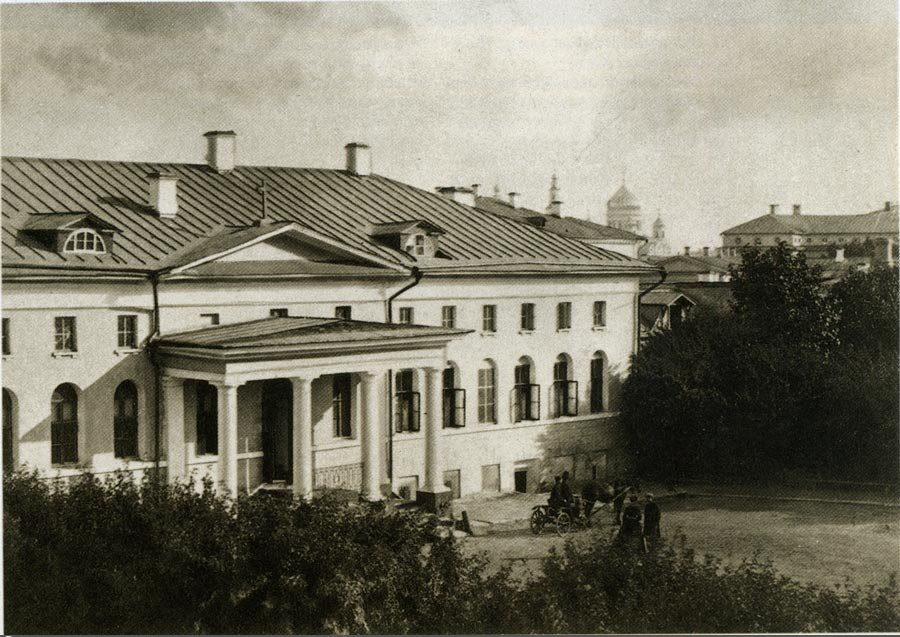
A c. 1860 photograph of the British Chapel, established in 1828

Sometime after the city burnt in 1812, services were held on Tverskaya Street in the palace of Princess Anne Aleksandrovna Golitsina. From 1817 to 1818 services were held in the home of the British ambassador, Earl Cathcart. British, German, and French Protestants all attended the services about this time. In 1825, the Russia Company established an independent chaplaincy in Moscow, and Tsar Alexander I, in one of his last official acts, approved the establishment of a church on 7 September. A chapel was opened, or perhaps re-opened, on Tverskaya Street in November 1825 with 100 of 400 British residents attending. The Russia Company provided £200 to renovate the building, which sat 200 people, with an additional £100 promised annually. The annual expenses were estimated at 4,750 rubles. The Rev. Charles Barton (or Burlton) was appointed by the Russia Company as chaplain in 1825 and the British Chapel was built in 1828 on the current site of St. Andrew's, at 8 Voznesensky (Ascension) Lane.

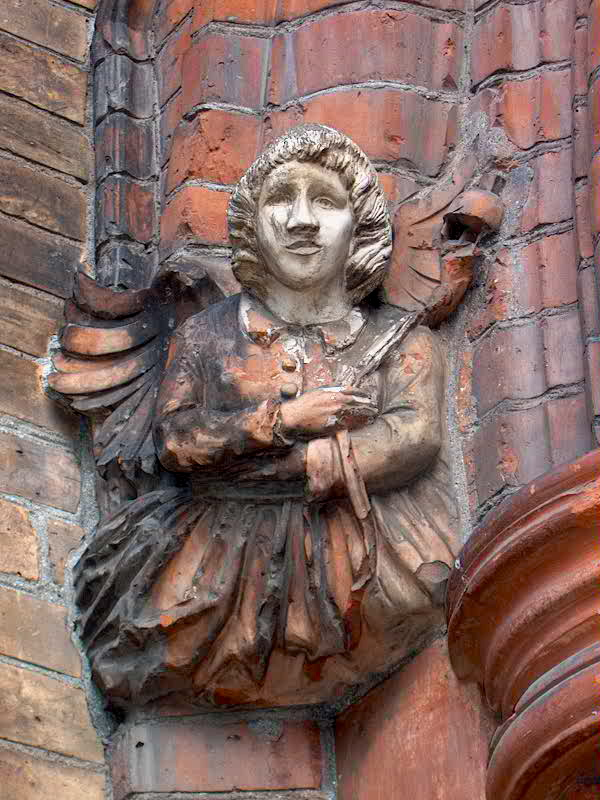
Angel at St. Andrew's holding a thistle, symbol of Scotland. Other angels at the church hold a rose, shamrock, and a leek, the symbols of England, Ireland, and Wales

By the 1880s the congregation had grown and a building larger than the chapel was needed. The Russia Company gave 25,000 rubles and the congregation raised 188,616 rubles to build the church. It was designed by Richard Knill Freeman, of Bolton, in the Victorian Neo-Gothic style.

At the time, the congregation was evenly divided between adherents of the Church of England and Scots who were members of the Presbyterian Church of Scotland. As a compromise, the church was named after St. Andrew, the patron saint of Scotland, and the Anglican Book of Common Prayer was to be used. To emphasise St. Andrew's role as a church for the whole United Kingdom, national symbols of Scotland (the thistle), England (the rose), Ireland (shamrock), and Wales (the leek) are incorporated into the church architecture.

Jonathan Holt Titcomb, the Bishop of London's coadjutor for North and Central Europe, consecrated the church on 25 January (13 January Old Style) 1885.

Jane McGill paid for the building of the parsonage in 1894. In 1904 she founded St. Andrew's House for indigent governesses and other ladies, on nearby Tverskaya Street.

== Confiscation and renewal ==
During the October Revolution, Bolsheviks mounted a machine gun post in the church tower to stop troops of the Provisional Government from advancing toward the Kremlin. The Bolsheviks were dislodged on 29 October 1917.

According to Herbert North, son of the Anglican chaplain Frank William North "we spent nearly a week in the basement with no light and little food. On emerging from the house at the end of the fighting we found many spent cartridges in the courtyard and two large pools of blood."

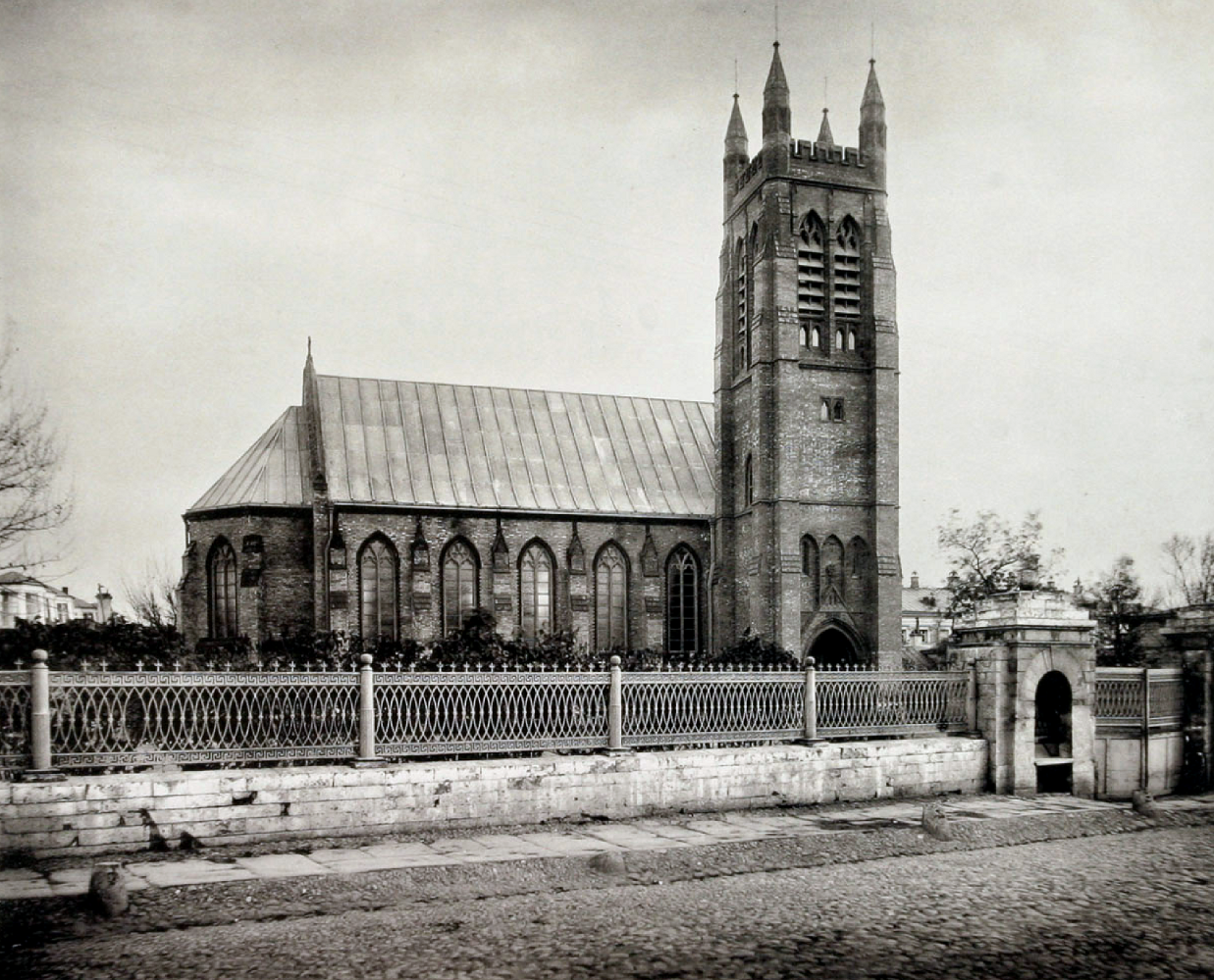
St. Andrew's in 2009

The church was confiscated in 1920 and the chaplain, the Rev. Frank North, was expelled from Russia. He later served in Helsinki, officially as the chaplain to Helsinki and Moscow. During the following 71 years, the Helsinki chaplain would occasionally conduct services at the British Embassy in Moscow.

The church and parsonage were used by the Soviets as a hostel for girls and to house diplomats from Finland and Estonia. In 1964 Melodiya took over the church as a recording studio. Dmitry Shostakovich and Mstislav Rostropovich both recorded at Melodiya's St. Andrew's studio.

Following perestroika, on 15 July 1991 the Helsinki chaplain, the Rev. Tyler Strand, celebrated the first Eucharist at St. Andrew's since 1920. Regular services began soon after. The Rev. Canon Chad Coussmaker was appointed permanent chaplain in 1993. The Rev. Dr Canon Simon Stephens served as chaplain from 1999 to June 2014. The current chaplain is Canon Malcolm Rogers.

Queen Elizabeth II visited the church on 19 October 1994 and agreed with Russian president Boris Yeltsin that the church would be returned. Russian prime minister Viktor Chernomyrdin signed the order to return the property to religious use, though in Russia, all religious property is officially state owned, with the congregation only having the right to use the property. Chernomyrdin's order was not immediately effective, with the property re-registered to the state only in January 2008 and Melodiya occupying parts of the property until about 2001.

Contemporary congregation includes people from Great Britain, the United States, Canada, Australia, New Zealand, India, Uganda, South Africa, Zimbabwe, Nigeria, Southern Sudan, Kenya and other countries with an Anglican heritage.

== See also ==
- Cathedral of the Immaculate Conception (Moscow)
- List of churches in Moscow
- Scottish Russians
