= George Pitcher =

George Pitcher may refer to:

- George Pitcher (journalist), British journalist, author and Anglican priest
- George Pitcher (philosopher), American philosopher
- George Pitcher (producer), British film producer
