= Catherine Wright Burcher =

New Zealand artist (1849–1921)

- Born: Catherine Wright Kerry; 1 July 1849; Bebington, Cheshire
- Died: 19 May 1921 (aged 71); Auckland, New Zealand
- Resting place: Purewa Cemetery, Meadowbank, New Zealand
- Known for: Painting and china painting
- Spouse: Albert Edward Burcher

Catherine Wright Burcher (née Kerry; 1 July 1849 – 19 May 1921) was a New Zealand artist.

== Biography ==
Burcher was born Catherine Wright Kerry in Bebington, Cheshire, United Kingdom, to Rubens James Kerry. On 9 May 1871 in Wallasey, Cheshire, she married Albert Edward Burcher, and they arrived in Auckland, New Zealand in 1878.

She was trained by a fellow of the Royal Art Society before she left the United Kingdom. She was well known for both her painting and glazing china. Burcher was secretary of an Auckland society for ladies who painted china, and she was given several pieces of china by Sir George Grey for her to copy.

Burcher was a member of the Auckland Art Society from its foundation and exhibited with them multiple times from 1881 to 1895. She also exhibited with the Society of Artists in 1879 and the Colonial and Indian exhibition in London in 1886; was on the committee of and exhibited with the New Zealand Art Students Association from 1884 to 1885; and taught art at the Auckland Girls' High School and in 1882 organised an exhibition of art by the students.

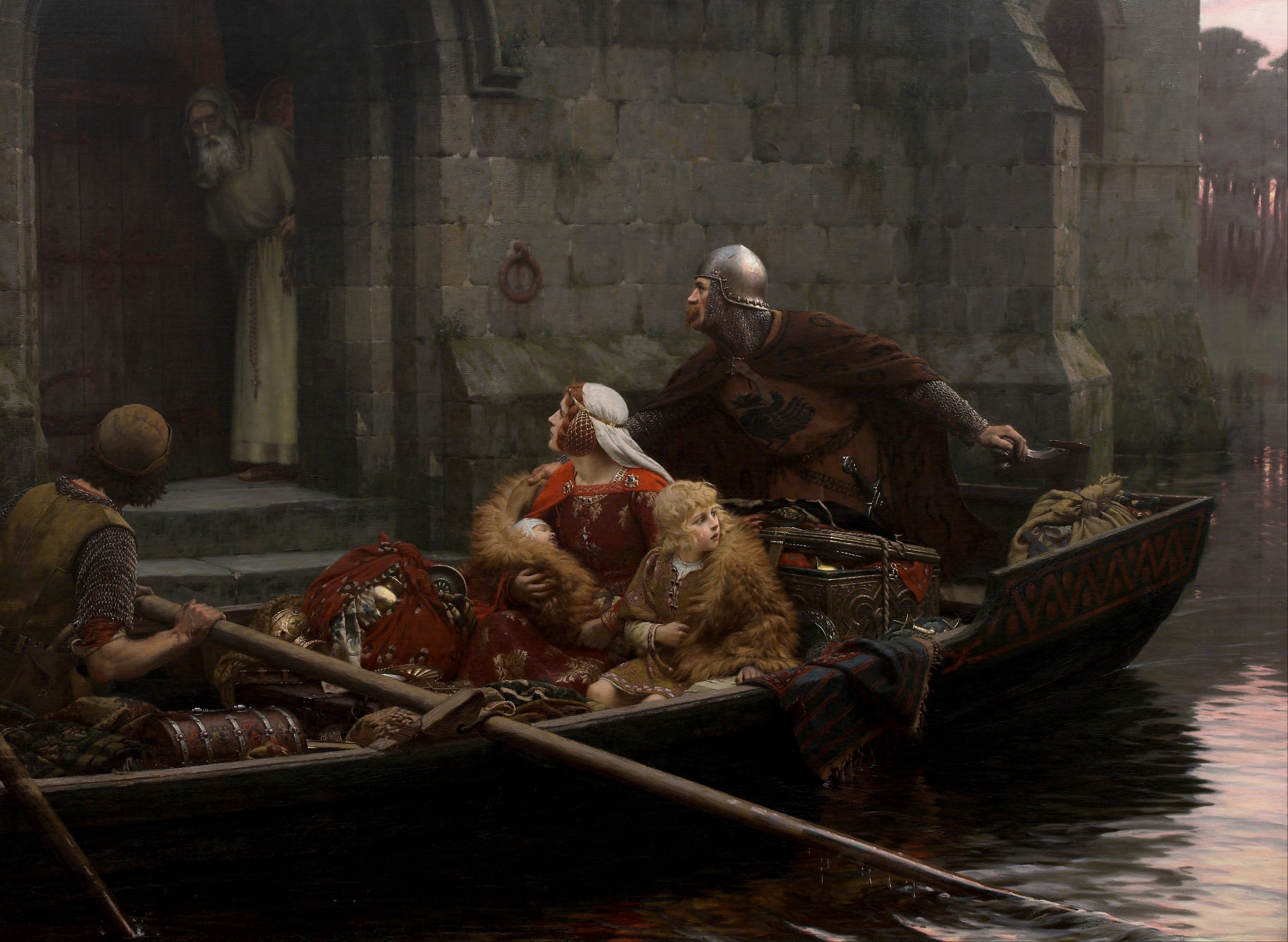
Edmund Blair Leighton (1897) In Time of Peril

During World War I, she made a copy of Edmund Blair Leighton's In Time of Peril, which is in the Auckland City Art Gallery (now Auckland Art Gallery Toi o Tāmaki) collection. It took 12 months for Burcher to make the copy and she consulted Leighton for advice as she painted. Sources are divided on how much Burcher's copy sold for to benefit the Red Cross: Platts states it was £2000, whereas her obituary suggests it was £800, both, however, were well above its estimated value of £500.

She died in Auckland on 19 May 1921.
