= Tuomas Mäkipää =

Anglican priest

The Reverend Tuomas Mäkipää
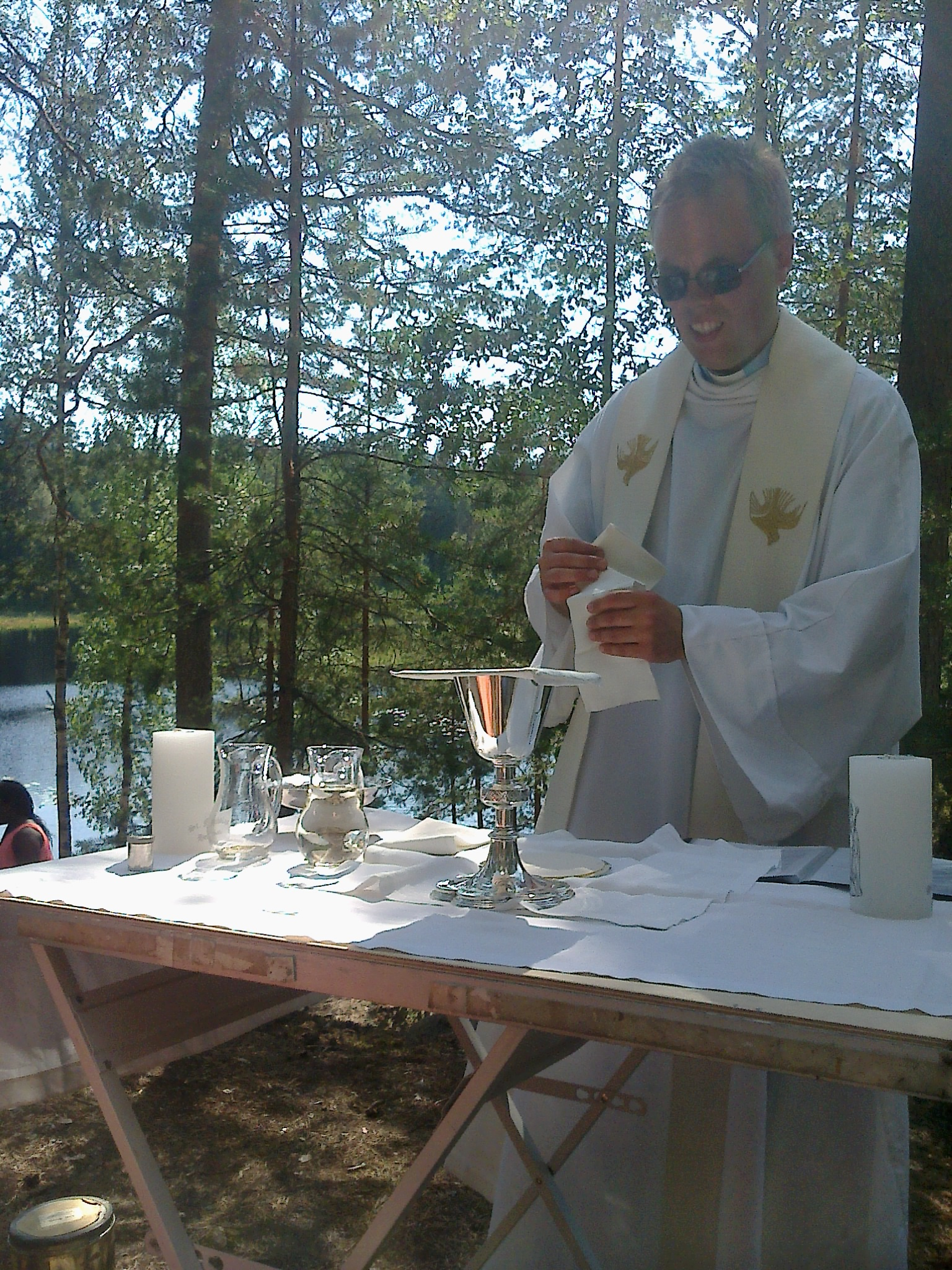
- Mäkipää preparing for the Eucharist in a forest in Uusimaa
- Born: 20 July 1978 (age 47); Pello, Finland
- Spouse: Suvi Mäkipää
- Religion: Anglicanism
- Church: Church of England
- Ordained: Deacon: 2005; Priest: 2010
- Offices held: Assistant curate, Chaplaincy of St Nicholas, Helsink (2005)i; Chaplain, Chaplaincy of St Nicholas, Helsinki (2012)
- Title: Chaplain, St Alban's Anglican Church, Copenhagen (2024); Area Dean for Finland

Tuomas Mäkipää is an Anglican priest of Finnish origin. He studied theology at Helsinki University.

Mäkipää was ordained deacon by the Rt Revd Geoffrey Rowell, Bishop of Gibraltar in Europe, at Mikael Agricola Church, Helsinki, in May 2005. He served as an assistant curate in the Chaplaincy of St Nicholas, Helsinki, and was ordained priest by the Rt Revd David Hamid, suffragan bishop of the Diocese in Europe, in 2010. He was the first Finnish Lutheran ordained in the Church of England under the Porvoo Agreement. He was appointed as chaplain of the Chaplaincy of St Nicholas in 2012.

In 2015, Mäkipää was elected to the General Synod of the Church of England. In February 2016, he was commissioned assistant area dean for Finland. In June the same year, he was elected chair of the House of Clergy of the Diocese in Europe's diocesan synod. He is also on the clergy roster of the Estonian Evangelical Lutheran Church.

In June 2024, Mäkipää was installed as the Anglican chaplain of St Alban's Church in Copenhagen.

In April 2025, The Bishop in Europe announced the appointment of Mäkipää as canon to the stall of St Titus in the Pro-Cathedral of St Paul, Malta, in recognition of his ministry as chaplain, area dean, synod member, and chair of the diocesan house of clergy.

== Styles ==
- The Reverend Tuomas Mäkipää (2005–2025)
- The Reverend Canon Tuomas Mäkipää (2025–)
