= Picher =

Picher may refer to the following two places:

- Picher, Oklahoma, a former city in the U.S. state of Oklahoma
- Picher, Germany, a municipality in Mecklenburg-Vorpommern, Germany
