= Harvey Pitcher =

English historian

Harvey Pitcher (born 26 August 1936) is an English writer, historian and translator. He was born in London, and attended Merchant Taylors' School. During his National Service (1955–57), he studied Russian at the Joint Services School of Linguists, qualifying as an interpreter. Afterwards, he read Russian at St John's College, Oxford, graduating in 1960 with First Class Honours.

He taught Russian at the University of Glasgow from 1961 to 1963, when he was asked to start the Russian department at the University of St Andrews. He stayed at St Andrews till 1971. He then took early retirement to concentrate on his writing, moving to Cromer on the Norfolk coast where he has lived ever since.

Pitcher published his first book in 1964. His two interests are Anton Chekhov and the British expatriate community in pre-revolutionary Russia. He wrote a biography of Chekhov's wife, the actress Olga Knipper. He co-translated Chekhov's early stories with Patrick Miles; this volume was later published in the Oxford World's Classics series. He wrote an account of English governesses in Russia, titled When Miss Emmie was in Russia (1977), reprinted in 2011 by Eland Books. He also wrote The Smiths of Moscow (1984) (on the British boilermakers) and Muir & Mirrieless (1994) (on the Scottish founders of TsUM department store).

== Selected works ==
=== Books ===
1. Understanding the Russians (George Allen & Unwin, 1964)
2. The Chekhov Play: A New Interpretation (Chatto & Windus/Barnes & Noble, 1973, reissued University of California Press, 1985)
3. Chuckle with Chekhov (Swallow House Books, 1975)
4. When Miss Emmie was in Russia: English Governesses before, during and after the October Revolution (John Murray, 1977; Readers Union, 1977; Century Travellers, 1984; reissued by Eland Publishing in 2011)
5. Chekhov's Leading Lady: A Portrait of the Actress Olga Knipper (John Murray/Franklin Watts, 1979; televised as A Wife Like the Moon in 1983 with Michael Pennington as Chekhov and Prunella Scales as Olga Knipper)
6. The Smiths of Moscow (Swallow House Books, 1984, reprinted 1985)
7. Lily: An Anglo-Russian Romance (Swallow House Books, 1987)
8. Myur i Meriliz: Shotlandtsy v Rossii (Muir & Mirrielees: Scots in Russia), Moscow, 1993
9. Muir & Mirrielees: The Scottish Partnership that became a Household Name in Russia (Swallow House Books, 1994)
10. Witnesses of the Russian Revolution (John Murray, 1994; Pimlico, 2001)
11. Responding to Chekhov: The Journey of a Lifetime (Swallow House Books, 2010)
12. The Origin Of Us, Edited and introduced by (Cromer, Swallow House Books, 2021) ISBN 9780905265131

=== Plays and Stage Adaptations ===
1. First Night: play to commemorate centenary of the Moscow Art Theatre production of The Seagull, performed by Iain Marshall at the Auden Theatre, Holt (1998)
2. Chekhov's Comic Twists: programme of early stories translated and adapted for the stage by Harvey Pitcher, and the one-act farce The Bear, translated and adapted by Patrick Miles, Little Theatre, Sheringham, 18–20 November 2010

=== Major Translations ===
1. Chekhov: The Early Stories 1883–88, translated by Patrick Miles and Harvey Pitcher (John Murray/Macmillan New York, 1982; Abacus 1984; World's Classics 1994, Oxford World's Classics 1999)
2. Chekhov: The Comic Stories, translated by Harvey Pitcher (André Deutsch, 1998; Ivan Dee, Chicago, 1999; revised paperback edition published by Deutsch, 2004)
3. If Only We Could Know! An Interpretation of Chekhov, by Vladimir Kataev, translated and edited by Harvey Pitcher (Ivan Dee, 2002)

=== Articles, Papers, Book Chapters ===
1. "A Scottish View of Catherine's Russia: William Richardson's ‘Anecdotes of the Russian Empire’ (1784)”, Forum for Modern Language Studies, vol.III, No.3, July 1967, pp.236–251
2. “Governess to Tanya Tolstoy”, Illustrated London News, September 1978, pp. 77–79
3. “Chekhov's Humour”, in A Chekhov Companion, ed.Clyman, Greenwood Press, 1985, pp. 87–103
4. “Chekhov and the English Governess: The Prototype of Charlotta Ivanovna in The Cherry Orchard”, Oxford Slavonic Papers, vol.xx, 1987, pp. 101–109; Russian translation in Chekhoviana, Moscow, 1990, pp. 158–166
5. “From a Tutor's Journal: An Introduction to the Life and Career of David Ker (1842–1914)”, Scottish Slavonic Review, vol.10, 1988, pp. 165–176
6. “Chekhov as a Humanist”, The Ethical Record, February 1994, pp. 3–6
7. “1917: The Myth and the Reality”, The Ethical Record, June 1995, pp. 3–7
8. “E. Pitcher & Co. (1880–1973)”, Antiquarian Horology, Winter 1996, pp. 151–155 (awarded the Percy Dawson medal for this article on the old family firm)
9. “Kommentarii k fotografiyam Lili Glassbi” (Commentary on the photographs of Lily Glassby), Chekhoviana, Moscow, 2005, pp. 99–104
10. “Chekhov's Last Moments”: memoir by L.L.Rabenek, Posledniye minuty Chekhova, first published in Vozrozhdeniye ("La Renaissance", Paris, December 1958, pp. 28–35), translated and with an introduction by Harvey Pitcher, Times Literary Supplement, 2 July 2004; reprinted North American Chekhov Society Bulletin, Autumn 2005; original Russian text with an introduction by Harvey Pitcher, Chekhoviana, Moscow, 2005, pp. 566–577
11. "From the Memoirs of a Literary Detective: An Unsolved Case”: Russian translation in Dialog s Chekhovym (Dialogue with Chekhov), 70th birthday volume in honour of V. B. Kataev (Moscow, 2009, pp. 153–160); English version in North American Chekhov Society Bulletin, 2010)
12. "The White Datcha, 1990" (East-West Review, Spring Edition 2010, pp. 28–31)
13. Entries for Andrew Muir, Archibald Mirrielees and Walter Philip, Oxford Dictionary of National Biography, 2004
