= Bircher (surname) =

Bircher is a surname. Notable people with the surname include:

- Alan Bircher (born 1981), British long-distance swimmer
- Paul Bircher (1928–2019), British rower
- Eugen Bircher (1882–1956), Swiss politician

== See also ==
- Maximilian Bircher-Benner (1867–1939), Swiss physician and pioneer in nutritional research
