= Fred B. Pitcher =

American politician (1867–1924)

Fred B. Pitcher (April 29, 1867 in Adams, Jefferson County, New York – September 2, 1924 in Watertown, Jefferson Co., NY) was an American lawyer and politician from New York.

== Life ==
He was the son of Seymour H. Pitcher. He attended the common schools and Adams Collegiate Institute. He graduated B.S. from Cornell University in 1888. Then he studied law in Watertown, was admitted to the bar in 1890, and practiced. He was Corporation Counsel of Watertown from 1898 to 1901; and District Attorney of Jefferson County from 1904 to 1910.

Pitcher was a member of the New York State Senate (37th D.) from 1919 to 1922, sitting in the 142nd, 143rd, 144th and 145th New York State Legislatures.

He died on September 2, 1924, in his law office in Watertown, New York, of a stroke; and was buried at the Adams Rural Cemetery.

== Sources ==
- Bio transcribed from Our County and Its People: a Descriptive Work on Jefferson County, New York by Edgar C. Emerson (1898)
- DEATH OF FRED B. PITCHER in the Jefferson County Journal on September 3, 1924

New York State Senate
Preceded by Adon P. Brown	New York State Senate; 37th District; 1919–1922	Succeeded by Willard S. Augsbury
