= Verheul =

Verheul is a Dutch toponymic surname. Notable people with the surname include:

- Carly Verheul (born 1980), Dutch cricketer
- Jan Verheul (1860–1948), Dutch architect
- Kees Verheul (born 1940, Dutch Slavist
