= Schiemond =

Coordinates: 51°54′13″N 4°26′35″E

- Neighborhood of Rotterdam
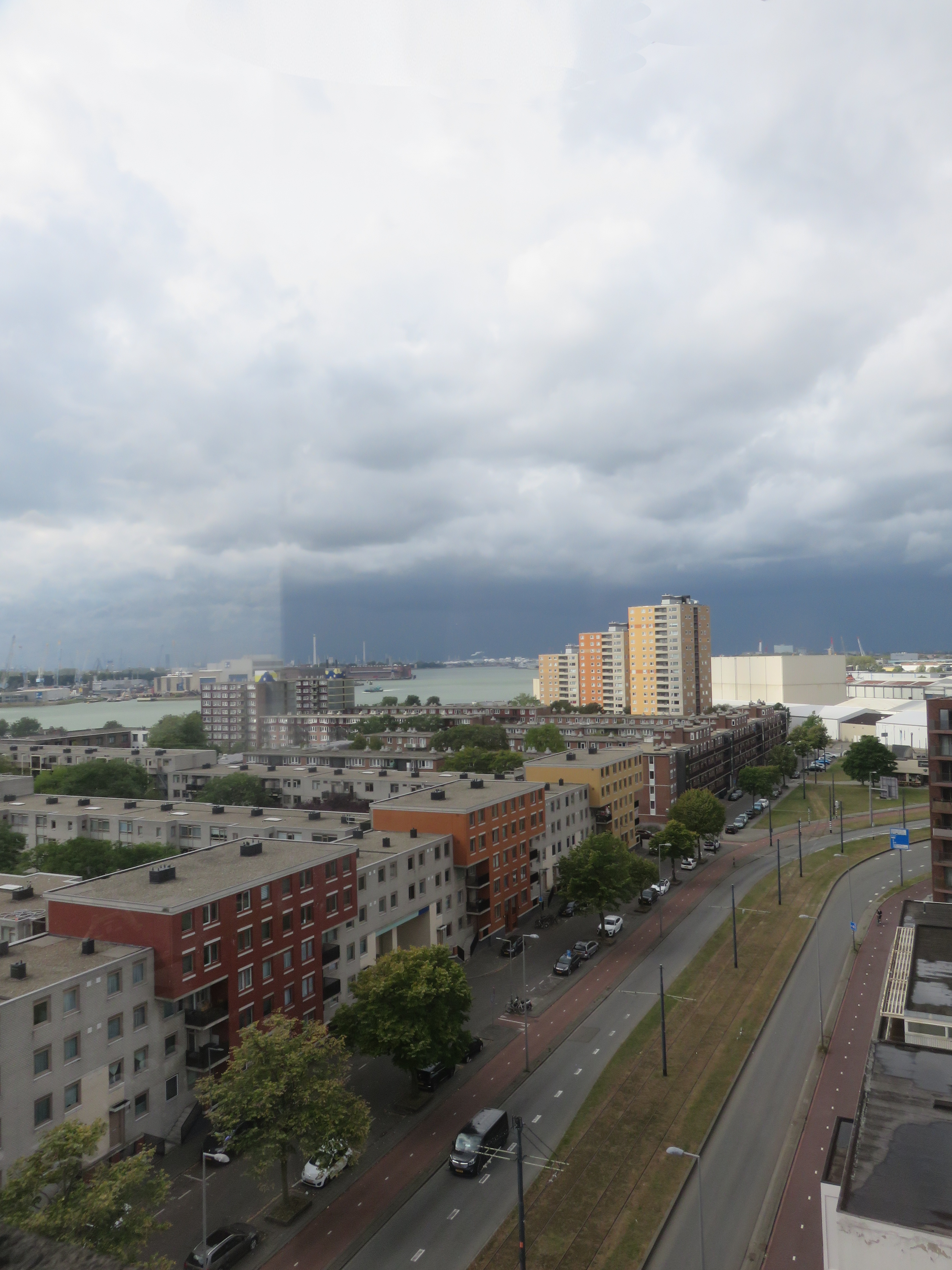
- Skyline Schiemond along the Nieuwe Maas
- Interactive map of Schiemond
- Country: Netherlands
- Province: South Holland
- COROP: Rotterdam
- Borough: Delfshaven
- Time zone: UTC+1 (CET)

Schiemond is a neighborhood of Rotterdam, Netherlands.

Schiemond a postwar district in the west of the city with approximately 3,500 inhabitants. The district is bounded to the east by the port of Schiemond, in the south by the Nieuwe Maas, in the west by the port areas of IJselhaven and Pelgrimsstraat and Westzeedijk in the north.

Schiemond consists mainly of social housing and was known as a 'problem district' in 2001. In recent years, improvements have occurred in here, and many buildings have been renovated. Schiemond was built in the eighties on a vacant port area, where the goodsyard of Wilton-Fijenoord and the company RS Stokvis and Sons were located.

Footballer Georginio Wijnaldum was raised in Schiemond.
