= Witte Dorp =

- Neighborhood of Rotterdam
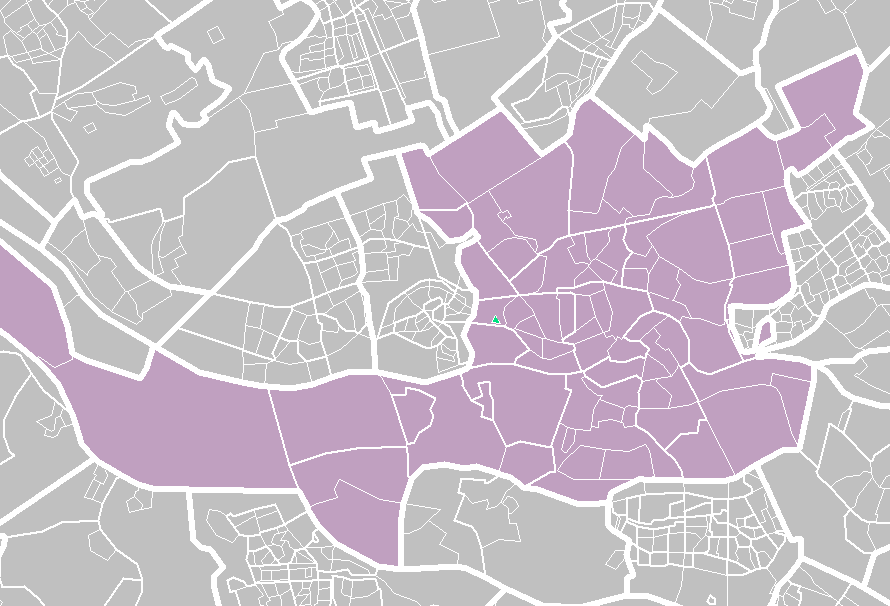
- Map of the Rotterdam districts with Witte Dorp marked out
- Interactive map of Witte Dorp
- Country: Netherlands
- Province: South Holland
- COROP: Rotterdam
- Borough: Delfshaven
- Time zone: UTC+1 (CET)

Witte Dorp is a neighborhood of Rotterdam, Netherlands.
