= Pilgrim Fathers Church =

Coordinates: 51.909°N 4.449°E

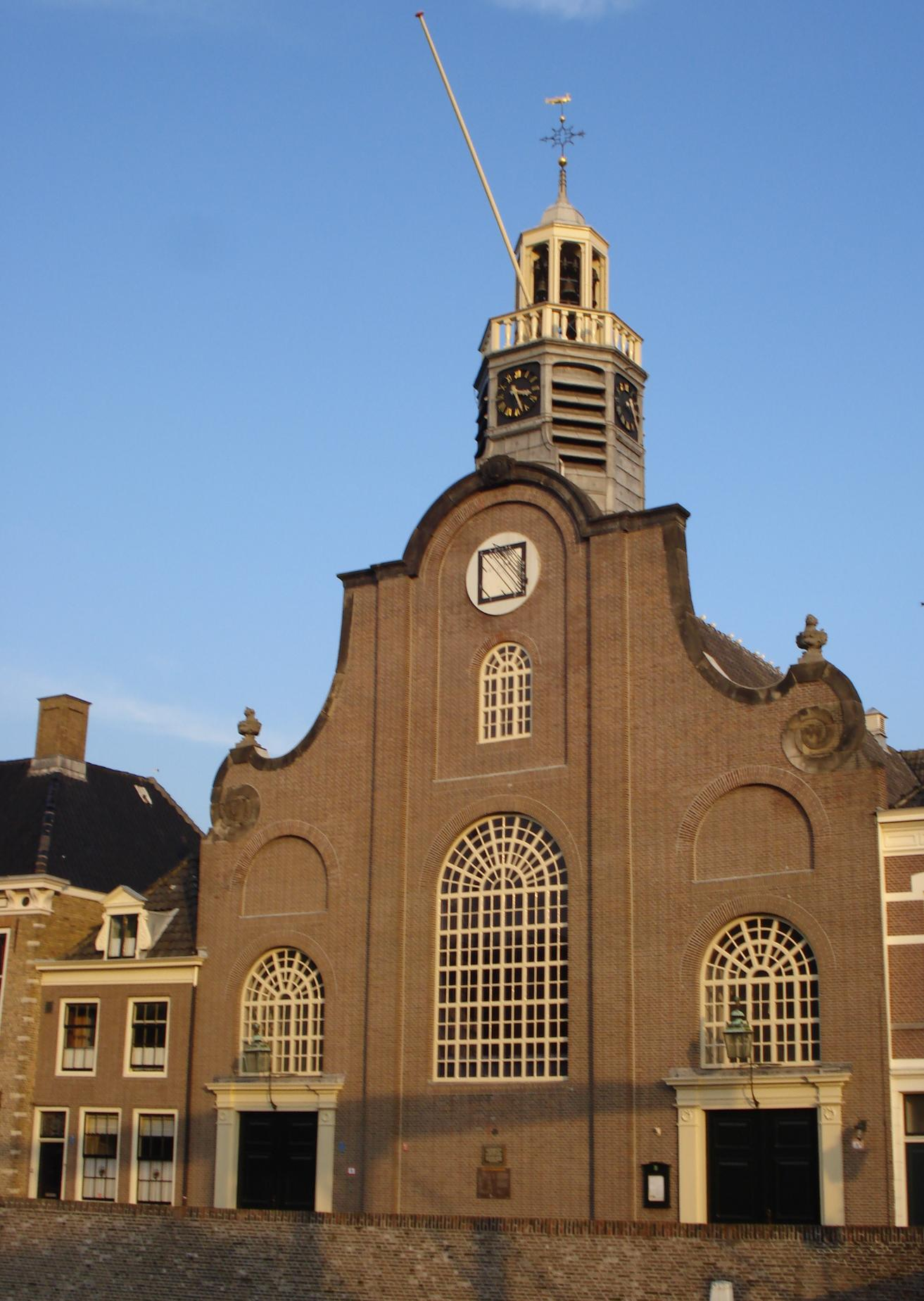
The façade of the church in 2007

The Old or Pilgrim Fathers' Church (Dutch: Oude of Pelgrimvaderskerk Rotterdam-Delfshaven) is a church located in Rotterdam-Delfshaven, in the Netherlands.

== History ==
The history of the Old or Pilgrim Fathers' Church goes back as far as 1417, when the Roman Catholic church of St Anthony was consecrated on this site. The oldest known depiction of the church dates from 1512. In 1574 during the Reformation, the church came into Protestant hands and was altered to suit its new function.

In 1608 a group of English Dissenters fled to the Netherlands. They had left the Church of England a few years before and founded their own religious community.

After living in Leiden for eleven years, they decided to become Pilgrims and cross to America, where they might worship God in their own way and still be Englishmen. The Speedwell left Delfshaven, on 21 July 1620, bound for America. According to the chronicles the Pilgrim Fathers knelt down in prayer on the quay near the church. Much later, American visitors gave the church its third name, Pilgrim Fathers' Church.

The most radical rebuilding took place in 1761. At this time the church was heightened considerably (3.6 metres (12 ft)) and was given its present facade with the bell-shaped gable.

In the nineteenth century the building with the text Eben-Haëzer ('helping stone') in its gable, was erected behind the church. The Stichting Oude Hollandse Kerken (Foundation Old Churches in Holland) acquired the church in 1992. A large-scale restoration was completed in 1998. The main user of the Pilgrim Fathers Church remains the Reformed Church Delfshaven. Besides the church activities, the Pilgrim Fathers Church is rented for concerts, lectures, weddings and exhibitions.

== Interior ==
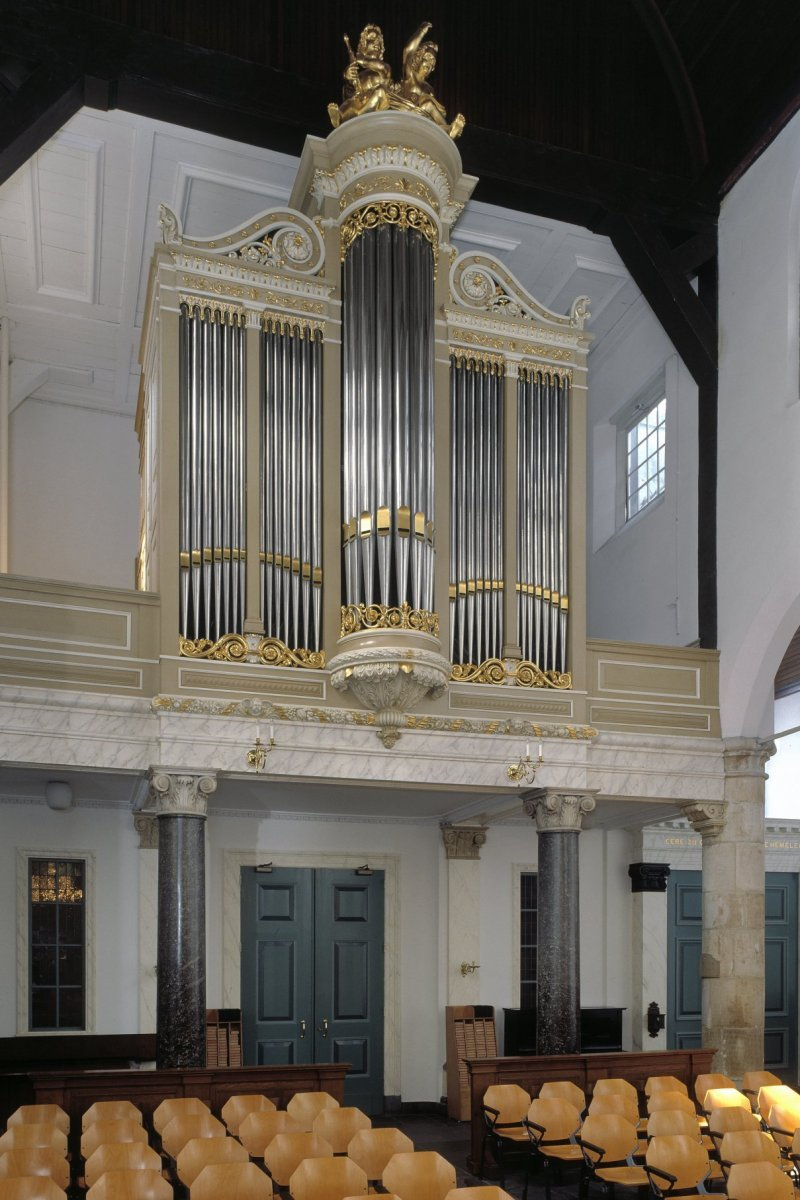
Interior of the church with the organ in 2000

The Old or Pilgrim Fathers' Church has a spacious and light interior. Arches, plastered white, divide the nave from the aisles. Commemorative panels, bearing the names of the vicars who served the community from 1574 adorn the otherwise bare walls. The richly carved pulpit dates from the eighteenth century.

As usual in Dutch Protestant churches, the pulpit stands within a rectangular enclosure. Here, the members of the church council sat during services and here, baptism was administered. The stained-glass windows in the choir represent the six days of Creation. It has a 44-bell carillon but the oldest bell, which was cast in 1464, is cracked and is now on display in the church.

== See also ==
- St Mary's Church, Rotterdam, Anglican church in Delfshaven
