= St Mary's Church, Rotterdam =

Church in Rotterdam, Netherlands

Coordinates: 51.542°N 4.273°E

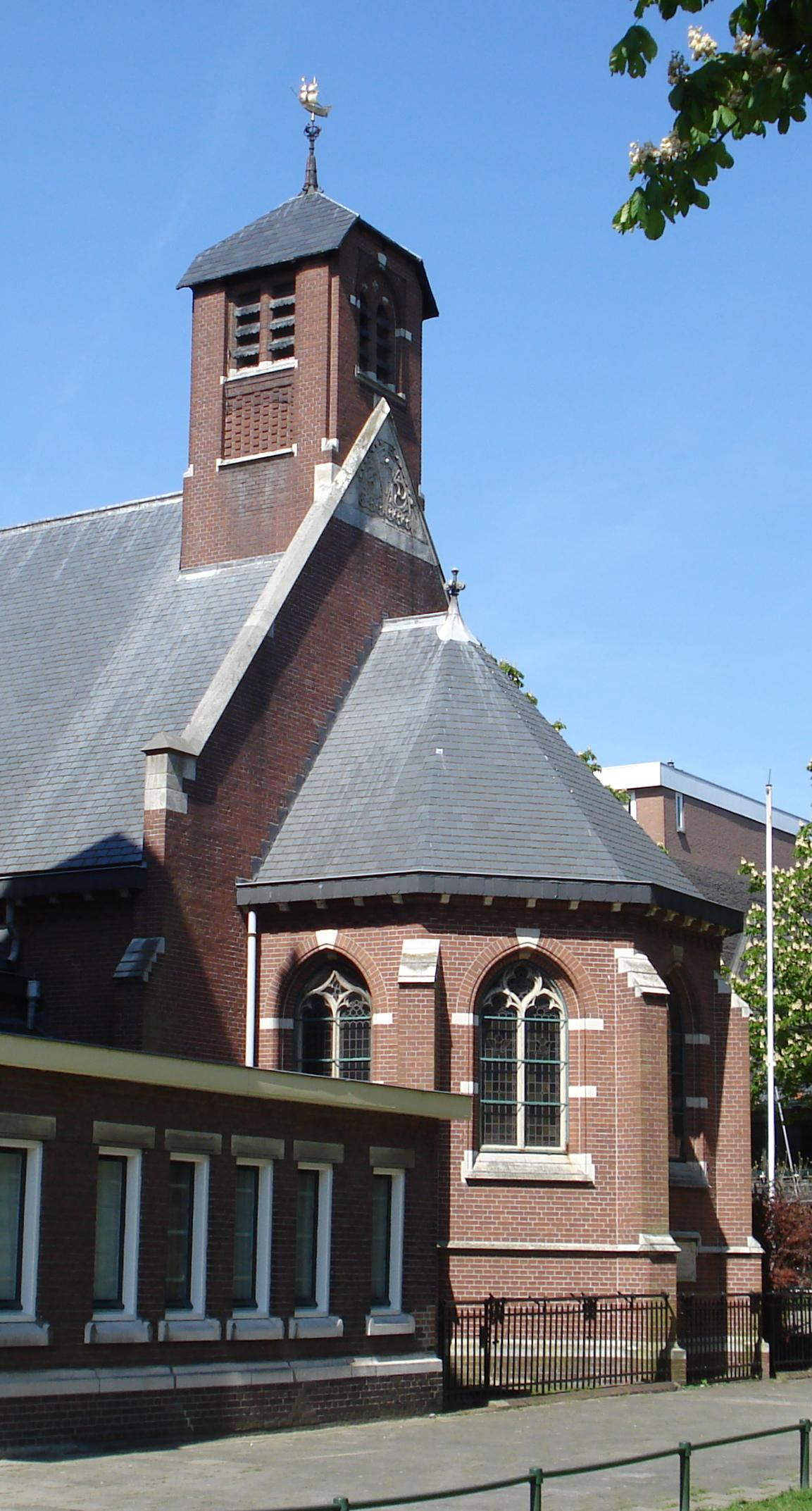
St Mary's Church, Delfshaven, Rotterdam

St Mary's Church or the English Church (Dutch: Engelse Kerk) is an Anglican church in Rotterdam in the Netherlands. It is part of the Archdeaconry of North West Europe in the Diocese in Europe of the Church of England.

== History ==
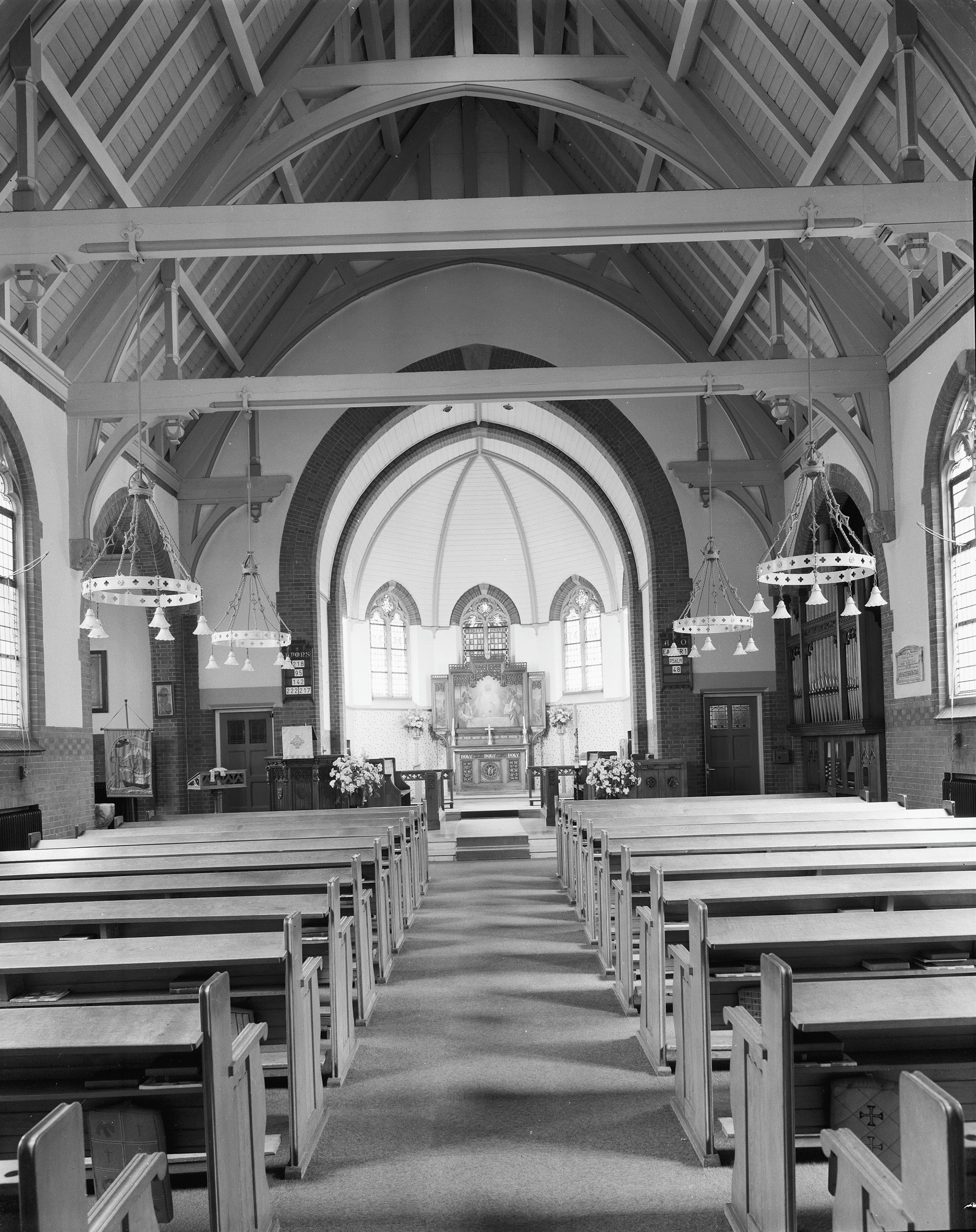
Interior, looking east

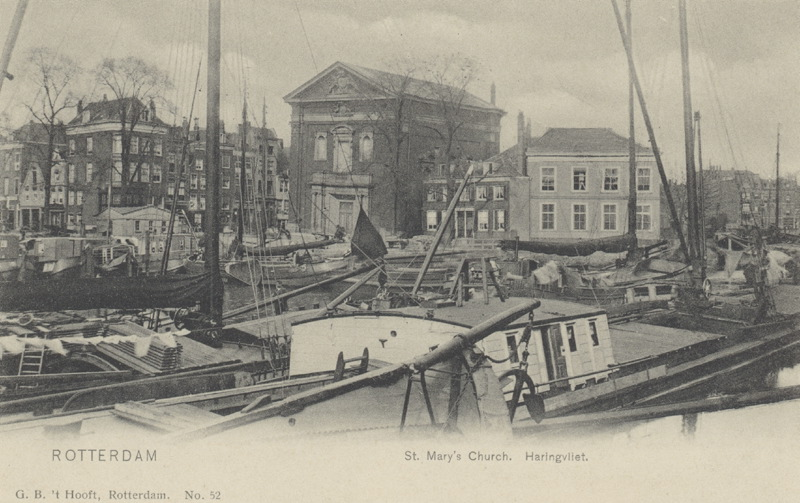
The English Church on the Haringvliet in 1902

In 1635 an English congregation shared St Peter's Church in the Hoogstraat of Rotterdam with French protestants but the Anglo-Dutch Wars dispersed the resident English community. In 1699, 17 families of English merchants in the city agreed to guarantee the stipend for a priest. Services began in a converted warehouse, but enough was raised through donations to construct a purpose-built building, the English Church of St Mary's in Rotterdam, consecrated in 1708. The many donors included Queen Anne, the Archbishop of Canterbury, the Duke of Marlborough and the diarist Samuel Pepys; the chaplain's stipend was paid by the British government.

The Church and its congregation flourished until most of the English population returned to England during the French Revolutionary Wars. The building was in a poor state when the congregation returned in 1815 after the French and later the Russian occupiers had used the church as prison, arsenal and granary.

The tower was struck by lightning in 1864 and had to be removed and repairs were necessary because the Church was starting to subside.

In 1878 St Mary's came under the patronage of the Colonial and Continental Church Society, now the Intercontinental Church Society (ICS), who still own the building and appoint the chaplain.

At the end of the 19th century the Port of Rotterdam was flourishing. To meet the need for more pastoral care and support for sailors, St Mary's Church, together with the Scots Church, opened a seamen's centre. In 1893 the Missions to Seamen were invited to work in conjunction with St Mary's.

In the early 20th century, the building on the Haringvliet was considered beyond repair and St Mary's Church and the Missions to Seamen were given permission to build a new church and seamen's club in Delfshaven, adjacent to the riverfront. The Rotterdam architect Jan Verheul designed the building in a neo-Gothic style and on 2 June 1913, Herbert Bury, Bishop of Northern and Central Europe, laid the foundation stone.

When the Rotterdam church was demolished, English author and academic A. C. Benson bought the interior woodwork. He presented the pulpit from St Mary's to Lincoln Cathedral in memory of his father, Edward White Benson, Archbishop of Canterbury 1882–1896. The altar rails are in St Giles' Church, Cambridge and panelling was given to Magdalene College, Cambridge and Selwyn College, Cambridge. The organ of 1773 was purchased by Henry Elford Luxmoore and given to Eton College.

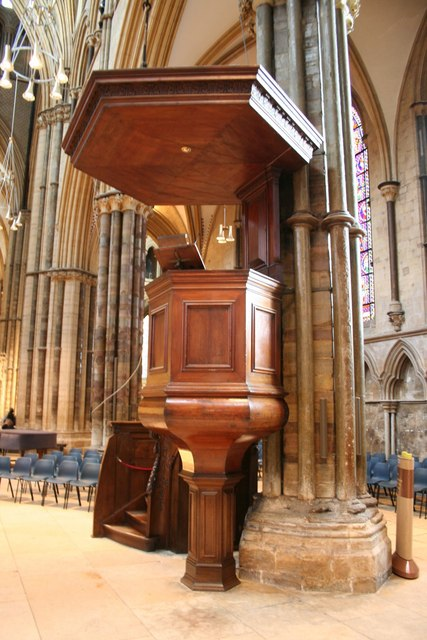
The pulpit from the former St Mary's, now in Lincoln Cathedral

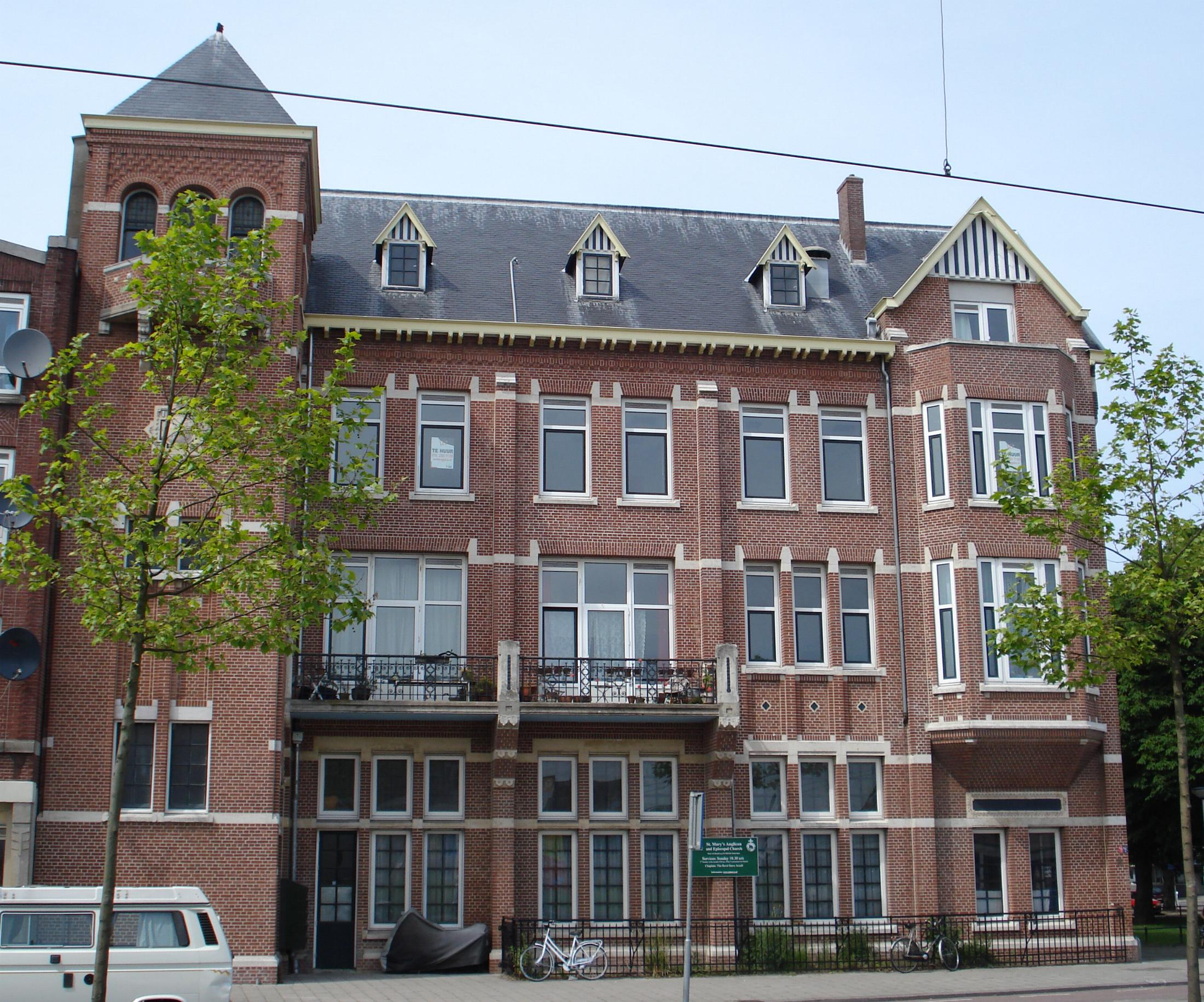
Rotterdam Mission to Seamen

After the completion of the church, in 1914-1915 an institute of the Missions to Seamen was built, also designed by Verheul. The two buildings are on the municipal monument list of Rotterdam.

During the First World War, the church was used for the internment of prisoners of war. The chaplain, Rev Henry Haworth Coryton, ministered to the PoWs in Groningen and, as a thank-offering, Leonard A. Powell painted the three-panelled reredos. A Harrison & Harrison organ was added in 1920.

In 1958, Queen Elizabeth II and Prince Philip together with Queen Juliana, Prince Bernhard and the Princesses Beatrix and Irene made a visit on the 250th anniversary of the Church. Queen Beatrix visited St Mary's in April 2008 for the 300th anniversary.

St Mary's Anglican and Episcopal Church continues to serve the English-speaking community in the Rijnmond conurbation.

== See also ==
- Pilgrim Fathers Church, Rotterdam
- Scots International Church, Rotterdam
