= Intercontinental Church Society =

Global Anglican mission organisation

Intercontinental Church Society (ICS) is a global Anglican mission organisation. ICS is a voluntary Evangelical society, a full member of the Partnership for World Mission, and therefore a recognized agency of the Church of England for overseas work through the medium of the English language. It supports ministry to people from all over the world and calls on people at home for prayer and financial support. Their current mission statement is "mission and ministry in English for everyone."

== History ==
=== The parent societies ===
ICS traces its origins to two of a spate of voluntary Societies that sprang out of the Evangelical revival at the end of the 18th and early 19th centuries It paralleled the English dispersion that spread across the world, and that followed the Industrial Revolution and the end of the Napoleonic Wars. Its leaders (clergy and laity) were largely associated with the Clapham Sect, and directed the thinking and responsibility of the Evangelicals of the Church of England towards the needs of their own people overseas as well as to the needs of foreign missions

The first of these Societies was the Newfoundland School Society founded by Samuel Codner in 1823. He was a west country fish merchant with interests in the Newfoundland cod banks. At the Bible Society annual meeting in Margate in 1821 he heard the Prime Minister (Lord Liverpool) declare that 'Britons had a special duty to perform arising out of their extensive colonies', and he challenged them to exert themselves. The PM saw a need, Codner saw a vision - to meet the educational needs of the Newfoundland fishermen and their children. He summoned a meeting at the London Coffee House on Ludgate Hill on 30 June 1823, 'for the purpose of establishing a society to promote the education of the poor in Newfoundland'.

The PM became patron; the Colonial Secretary (the Earl of Bathurst) became president; vice-presidents included the Bishop of Lichfield & Coventry (Henry Ryder) and William Wilberforce MP. The first committee included Josiah Pratt and Edward Bickersteth (joint Secretaries of the CMS), Samuel Crowther and Daniel Wilson (vicar of Islington and afterwards Bishop of Calcutta).

Codner set up lay Associations all over the country to promote the cause, the Foreign Office granted land and free passages in government ships for teachers, the first arrivals at Newfoundland St John (in August 1824) rented a building and opened a school on 20 September. Within six months 249 children and 90 adults had enrolled, and in the succeeding three years 965 children and 274 adults attended daily school. The staff also undertook general missionary work. The Bishop of Newfoundland subsequently ordained some of them and these 'deacon-schoolmasters' took charge of congregations.

It was always intended to break ground in other parts of British North America, hence the change of name in 1829 and, as the work expanded elsewhere in the world, a further change of name still in 1846 as an educational Society for Newfoundland and all the Colonies.

=== A general missionary society ===
The British government of Lord Liverpool decided in 1823 to revive the Greek idea of free daughter communities to promote settlements in unoccupied stretches of colonial territories where land, capital and labour could be brought together. This policy led to the development of Australia between 1831 and 1851. Captain James Stirling was sent to Western Australia as governor of the Swan River Colony with the support of Frederick Chidley Irwin as officer in charge of the 63rd Regiment. After 1829 the population of free settlers rose to over 4,000. The English chaplain in Perth could only visit fortnightly, so Irwin and a Mr GF Moore held services in the barracks. Irwin tried to excite interest in this mission at home but with little success. He returned to England in 1835 and appealed to the Revd Baptist Noel (minister of St John's Chapel, Bedford Row in London, who later helped to found the Evangelical Alliance in 1846). A meeting was called at 32 Sackville Street, off Piccadilly, with the support of Lord Teignmouth (former Governor General of India) and Lord Glenelg (Colonial Secretary), both of whom were members of the Clapham Sect. At that meeting the Western Australia Missionary Society was founded.

The first missionary was the Revd Dr Giustiniani and a young catechist, a Mr Waldeck, soon to be followed by the Revd W Mitchell (a former CMS missionary from Bombay). Services were set up in Guildford, Albany and Middle and Upper Swan. Within the year the work spread to New South Wales and caused a change of name to Australia CMS. Two years later a further change became necessary - on 15 May 1838 the Colonial Church Society was formed for all the colonies. The principle of the provision of ministry concurrently with settlement rather than following it was adopted.

These two Societies existed side by side operating in the same fields and based on the same Evangelical principles, appealing to the same constituency at home, and doing the same work. It was inevitable that amalgamation should be discussed and eventually take place. Codner addressed the CCS committee on 19 December 1839 urging the union of the two Societies.

=== Beginnings in Europe ===
A descriptive sub-title was added to the name of the CCS in 1838, 'For sending out clergymen, catechists and schoolmasters to the Colonies of Great Britain and to British residents in other parts of the world'. The General Meeting of the CCS on 14 May 1839 'Considered it to be highly expedient that attention and help should be extended to English residents on the Continent of Europe'.

The first grant of £40 for one year was made to a Mr Robbins in Bagni-di-Lucca where there was a congregation of 90–100, and where there were two Sunday services and a weekly lecture. Within a year it had become self-supporting. William Chave (clerical Secretary of the CCS) undertook a Continental deputation tour in February 1840, and set up a support organization in Paris. The industrial skills and labour which were the product of the early Industrial Revolution led to a demand on the Continent for English engineers, trades people and labourers and, in consequence, support was given to places like Lille in 1839 for a missionary district to include Amiens, St Quentin, Arras, Cambrai and Cassel, Douai. In the following year a grant was made to Chantilly for a lay ministry based in Paris for a missionary district that included Courteuil, Mont l'Eveque, Lamorlaye, Gouvieux and Creil. Also to Lyon in 1841 for river boat people. Coblenz was added in 1842 and The Hague and Rouen in 1843 - the latter for sailors and railway workers.

Seasonal chaplaincies began in 1844 at Interlaken in Switzerland following a deputation there in 1842. By 1888 there were 80 and by the outbreak of the first World War the number rose to 160, and they became a source of income for the Society.

However, at that time chaplaincies developed sporadically, and the Continental work remained incidental to the Society's Colonial ventures

=== 19th century ===
William Wilberforce became a vice-president. William IV was the first royal patron. This relationship has been continued by succeeding monarchs.

In the 19th century the Society emerged as the principal Church Society for Anglican missions to our own people overseas (as the CMS was for the indigenous populations and the CP-AS was for home mission work). It exercised ministry in Australia, British North America, South Africa, Nassau (Bahamas), British West Indies, India and Hong Kong (sailors in foreign ports). One could see that it had an open door before it, as enquiries were coming from the Azores, Mexico, St Helena, the Falklands and Argentina (Buenos Aires). For its part the Society made enquiries where it discovered need (e.g. the Gold Coast). At the end of the 1840s it had a world involvement supporting 43 agents on an income of £4,000.

=== The Colonial Church and School Society, 1851–61 ===
The union of the NSS and CCS took place on 1 January 1851: its new name was to be the Colonial Church and School Society, and Mesac Thomas (afterwards first Bishop of Goulburn in New South Wales) was appointed Secretary. The decade of his leadership saw advance in six spheres of ministry: general missionary work in the colonies, the setting up of teachers training colleges, and missions to the Free Coloured population, to the Indians and French Canadians in Canada, among sailors in foreign ports, the army in the Crimea and Continental chaplaincies. In 1851 the Society supported 18 clergy, 63 teachers, 20 women, and had seven episcopal patrons and 380 clerical supporters with an income of £6,980. By the end of the decade the figures were: 254 missionaries, 36 episcopal patrons, 2,420 clerical supporters with an income of £27,887.

=== Unparalleled growth in continental chaplaincies ===
This decade saw systematic measures to raise standards and co-ordinate Continental chaplaincies in North and Central Europe under the Bishop of London. The Society's Continental work became integral rather than incidental to its Colonial work. William Chave (last Secretary of the CCS) was appointed general agent in Europe in 1851 and was sent out to supervise lay agents, to deputize for the Society and to recommend actions. In 1852 he visited 20 resorts in France, Germany and Switzerland. By 1857 the Society was involved in 25 chaplaincies (e.g. Basel, Lucerne, Vevey (1853), Zurich and The Hague (1854), and was ready to nominate to Lille, Bremen, Stuttgart, Turin and Madrid. A Continental committee was set up in 1856 to raise funds and raise a better system under the Bishop of London (AC Tait) who expressed his approval and who became a member of the Society in 1857.

=== Colonial and Continental Church Society, 1861–1958 ===
==== Prior to the First World War ====
On 1 May 1861 Archibald Campbell Tait, the bishop of London, and Bishop Sumner of Winchester proposed and seconded a motion to adopt a new title for the Society: the Colonial and Continental Church Society. The aim was to reflect more accurately the twin spheres of its work. During this period it became the pioneer of popular education in Canada, developed subsidiary missions and established theological education there, and missions to the Eskimo. It supported expansion into the Canadian Far West which led to a new departure following Archbishop Matheson's (Rupert's Land) speech to the Society's AGM in 1905, 'Fancy what it would mean for the future of the Church if the Church could be established concurrently with incoming settlement...to plant the Church and sustain it for a few years, and it will soon sustain itself.' Now the Church's missionaries were to accompany the tide of settlers rather than follow them. In the early years of the 20th century, there was a vastly increased immigration into the NW Territories where a large 'colony' of British subjects was being organized for settling in a district of Saskatchewan, and George Exton Lloyd (a deputation Secretary of the Society) volunteered to accompany it. It was called the 'Britannia' Colony. It settled an area larger than Yorkshire with 22 townships of 36 square miles each - initially of 157,000 rising to 404,000 people. In 1906 he returned to England, appealed for, and took out, 60 ordination candidates (the 'Saskatchewan 60'). Lloyd originated other ideas: Sunday School by Post and a Church Workers' Hostel (to train women for Church work). By 1913 some 200 clergy and lay workers had gone out to western Canada.

Meanwhile, work continued in the W Indies, India, South Africa and Australia and New Zealand (dioceses of Waiapu, Auckland and Wellington).

=== Australia ===
By 1907 immigration into Australia had revived such that three 'Bush' diocese were carved out of Melbourne diocese (Bendigo, Gippsland and Wangaratta) and they looked to the Society for support for theological education (Wangaratta's St Columb's Hall and Sale Divinity Hostel) and students at Ridley College and Moore College were given grants for training.

=== Unparalleled growth in continental chaplaincies ===
Grants were made in support of permanent chaplaincies on a reducing basis to encourage self-support and to be able to allocate elsewhere. By 1913 the Society was supporting 39 permanent and 160 seasonal chaplaincies. There was also considerable growth in church buildings through the George Moore Fund which raised capital. During this period the Society took initiatives to fund a second bishopric in support of the Bishop of London for North and Central Europe. It was in January 1884 that the committee resolved to bear the entire cost of the bishop's stipend and expenses. The Bishop of London then gave his permanent commission to Bishop Titcomb (late of Rangoon) as co-adjutor bishop.

=== After the First World War: 1919–1958 ===
These years (1920–70) were marked by transition from Empire to Commonwealth and during that period the Churches marched towards self-support and independence. The Society began to withdraw aid, and by 1941-2 it had been relieved of some 50% of its grants to Canadian dioceses as the Church assumed responsibility. By 1950 the process was virtually complete. Australia experienced the same movement and the process there was complete by 1952.

In May 1919 the Bush Church-Aid Society for Australia and Tasmania was founded to alert people in the cities to the needs of the back blocks and to raise funds. Immigrants streamed into Western Australia and Victoria and to meet this need there were some exciting developments followed: setting up of hospitals in four States, Anglican Flying Medical Services (1937–67), the 'Flying Parson' (Leonard Daniels from Woking to Wilcannia, NSW in 1922), the School of the Air, children's Hostels, Mail-bag Sunday School and training of ordinands and women workers.

There was growth in East Africa in chaplaincies and the Limuru Girls School, and Sunday School by Post. Also in West Africa in Northern Nigeria and Sierra Leone, and in Japan.

Seasonal chaplaincies in Europe reopened in 1920 (France 8, Corfu 1, Italy 3, Portugal 1, Spain 1, Switzerland 23) and the trend rose until the 1930s. But the work was again curtailed by economic conditions and the disturbed political situation in Europe, and it came to an end in 1938. After the War, in 1946, Paris, Cannes, Ostend, Amsterdam and Oslo reopened, but a number of churches were destroyed by enemy action (The Hague by the RAF in error). By 1948 14 permanent chaplaincies reopened and by 1949 five winter and 16 summer seasonal chaplaincies were operating. The grant to the Bishop was renewed in 1919 and when the Bishopric of Fulham was established in 1926 it was renewed again. This was the first time that a bishop was consecrated for control in N and C Europe. In 1948 a grant was made to the Bishop of Gibraltar for travelling expenses.

The Package Holiday industry expanded in the 1970s and David Steele was appointed to the staff to develop ministry to tourists. 'Purpose Holidays' were arranged in 1972 and in four years there were 200 people serving in 20 evangelistic teams on campsites at different places throughout Europe In 1983 a new campsite ministry was started under Charles Bonsall linked to a chaplain. Then in 1986 Thompsons 'Young at Heart' programme sponsored chaplains for its clients and services took place in hotel lounges. Two years later SAGA joined in; then each offered five chaplaincies of some six weeks each.

=== Church-planting ===
Europe experienced a new wave of immigration from all over the world which paralleled the creation of the EEC (later European Union), and then followed a period of new church-planting by some long-standing chaplaincies which both drew people abroad and caught the eye of people at home. We can identify the following: Tervuren by Brussels (1988); Liege by Tervuren (1992); Heiloo (1990) and Den Helder (1998) by Amsterdam; Amersfoort, Harderwijk, Groningen and Zwolle by Utrecht; Versailles from Maisons-Laffitte; Gif-sur-Yvette from Versailles; Freiburg-im-Breisgau from Basel (2001); Sharjah and Jebel Ali by Dubai.

=== 1990s onwards ===
The Society was directly involved in the establishing of: Ayia Napa (Cyprus 1993), Leipzig (1995), Warsaw (1996) and Gdansk (1999), Nord (Pas-de-Calais based in Lille 1998), Kyiv (Ukraine 1999), Prague (an Anglican church in an Old Catholic diocese ecumenical project 2000), Klaipeda (Lithuania 2000), Poitou-Charentes (6 rural centres 1999), Brittany (rural based on Ploermel and two other centres 2000).

Success was evident when chaplains were visionary and entrepreneurial, attuned to accessible worship styles, strong Bible teachers with a heart for people, and gentle evangelists.

=== 20th century ===
The name of the Society was changed in 1958 to the Commonwealth and Continental Church Society and to the Intercontinental Church Society in 1979 as virtually all the Society's work was by then being carried on outside Commonwealth countries.

ICS, along with other mission agencies, including South American Mission Society (SAMS), Church Society and Crosslinks has worked in continental Europe for over 150 years. The Diocese in Europe was set up in 1981. ICS was involved in the development of Continental chaplaincies from 1839, beginning at Bagni di Lucca, near Pisa, in Italy. The Colonial and Continental Church Society nominated and financially supported the first Bishop of the Suffragan See of Fulham. Over the years grants were made to both the Bishop of Gibraltar and the Bishop of Fulham. The second Bishop of Fulham (W M Selwyn) was a sitting member of the Colonial and Continental Church Society committee at the time of his consecration.

=== 21st century ===
The work of ICS continues in the 21st century. The current mission director is the Reverend Richard Bromley MA. The work is resourced from Coventry in the United Kingdom. There are 55 chaplains in 65 locations both on permanent and temporary bases.

ICS Has patronage, the historic right of appointment in 24 chaplaincies.

== Chaplaincies in Europe ==
ICS has patronage, the historic right of appointment, in 24 chaplaincies*. In addition ICS links with Associate Ministry Partners, clergy who choose to link to ICS with their chaplaincy's support.

Chaplaincies in Europe
Country	City	Chaplaincy
Belgium	Brugge	St. Peter*
Belgium	Brussels	Holy Trinity Brussels
Belgium	Kortrijk	The English Church
Belgium	Liege	The English Church
Belgium	Knokke	The English Church
Belgium	Ostend	The English Church*
Belgium	Tervuren	St. Paul*
Czech Republic	Prague	St. Clement
France	Aquitaine	Aquitaine*
France	Brittany	Christ Church
France	Cannes	Holy Trinity*
France	Chantilly	St. Peter*
France	Grenoble	St. Marc*
France	Lille	Christ Church*
France	Lorgues	No longer in existence.
France	Lyon	Trinity Church Lyon*
France	Maisons-Laffitte	Holy Trinity*
France	Midi Pyrenees and Aude	The Anglican Chaplaincy of Midi Pyrenees and Aude
France	Paris	St. Michael*
France	Poitou Charentes	Christ the Good Shepherd
France	Vendée	All Saints
France	Versailles	St. Mark*
Germany	Dresden	Frauenkirche
Germany	Freiburg	Anglican Church Freiburg
Germany	Leipzig	Leipzig English Church
Greece	Corfu	Holy Trinity
Netherlands	Amersfoort	All Saints
Netherlands	Amsterdam	Christ Church*
Netherlands	Amsterdam	Schiphol Airport
Netherlands	Arnhem and Nijmegen	Anglican Church in Arnhem* and Nijmegen*
Netherlands	Groningen	Grace Anglican Church
Netherlands	Heiloo	Christ Church*
Netherlands	Rotterdam	St. Mary*
Netherlands	The Hague	St. John and St. Philip*
Netherlands	Utrecht	Holy Trinity*
Netherlands	Voorschoten	St. James*
Netherlands	Zwolle	Anglican Church
Spain	Barcelona	St. George's*
Spain	Ibiza	The English-speaking Church on Ibiza and Formentera
Switzerland	Basel	Anglican Church Basel*
Switzerland	Chateau d'Oex	St. Peter*
Switzerland	Neuchatel	Neuchatel English Church
Switzerland	Vevey	All Saints*
Turkey	Izmir	St. John's

Chaplaincies Rest of the World
Country	City	Chaplaincy
Brazil	Rio de Janeiro	Christ Church
Chile	Valparaíso	St. Paul
Chile	Vina del Mar	St. Peter
Egypt	Cairo	All Saints Cathedral
Egypt	Maadi	St. John the Baptist
Falkland Islands	Stanley	Christ Church Cathedral
North Africa	Algiers	Holy Trinity
North Africa	Tunis	St. George
Thailand	Bangkok	Christ Church
United Arab Emirates	Sharjah	St. Martin

== Partner agencies ==
- Bush Church Aid Society
- Mission to Seafarers
- Church Mission Society/South American Mission Society

== Bodies of which ICS is a member ==
- Partnership for World Mission
- Global Connections
- The Evangelical Patrons Consultative Council
- The cross-tradition Patrons' consultative Group
