= Lyon Anglican Church =

Church in France

Coordinates: 45.7460°N 4.8379°E

The Lyon Anglican Church (now known as Trinity Church Lyon) is a church of the Anglican Archdeaconry of France, part of the Diocese of Europe and is run by the Intercontinental Church Society.

English-language church services were first held in Lyon by a Rev. McDermott as early as 1843. Then, in 1853 Rev. E.L. Ward was appointed as chaplain. The first Confirmation Service took place in 1863. In the early days, the congregation shared a Chapel in the Cordeliers area of the city with Lyon's German-speaking Protestant congregation which later became the Lutheran Church and French-speaking.

On 18 February 1873 Holy Trinity, on the quays of the river Rhône was consecrated for use as a church building. Services were held here until 19 May 1969, when the building was sold and later demolished, although some wooden crosses - one of which now serves as the central Cross in the Chapel - were made from the old pews. In a return to its origins, Lyon Anglican Church became known as Trinity Church Lyon in September 2017.

Services were then held at the Centre St. Irénée, Place Gailleton, until December 1978 and then at Mains Ouvertes, Part Dieu, from January 1979 to December 1995. The first service at the next location in rue de Créqui was held on 10 December 1995. Services were held in the chapel of the Couvent de l'Adoration Réparatrice, 131 boulevard Yves Farges from December 2007. Starting in October 2018, Sunday services were held at Notre Dame de Lourdes, 63 rue des Essarts, 69500 Bron. In November 2021, the church moved to the Eglise protestante unie de France (United Protestant Church of France) premises at 50 rue Bancel, Lyon 69007.

The current full-time chaplain is Ben Harding and the assistant chaplain is Craig Taylor.
