= Jan Verheul =

Dutch architect, watercolourist, and designer

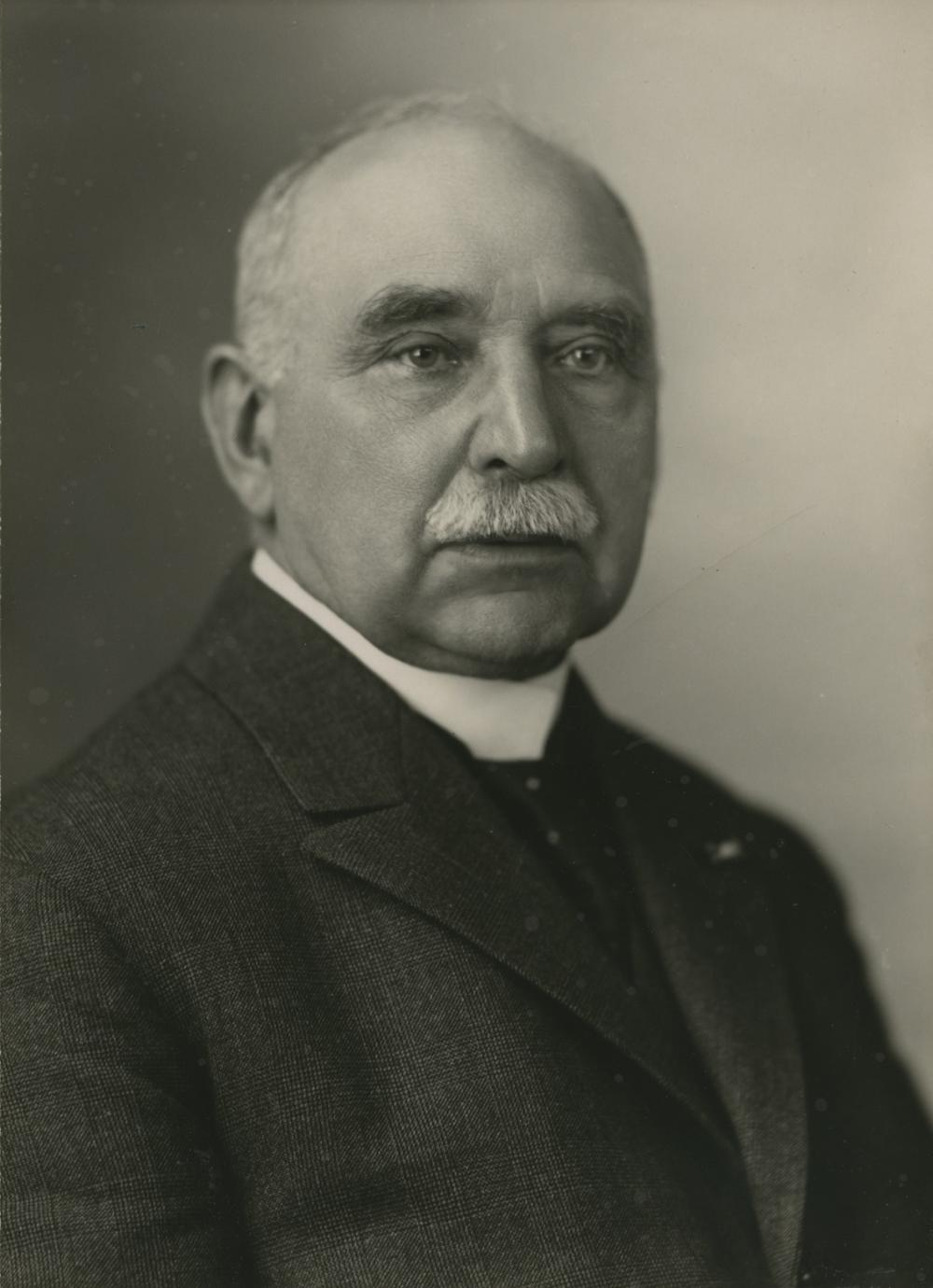
- Jan Verheul (before 1936)
- Born: February 14, 1860; Rotterdam
- Died: October 19, 1948 (aged 88); Rotterdam
- Occupation: Architect

Jan Verheul or J. Verheul Dzn. (Rotterdam, 14 February 1860 - 19 October 1948) was a Dutch architect, watercolourist and designer.

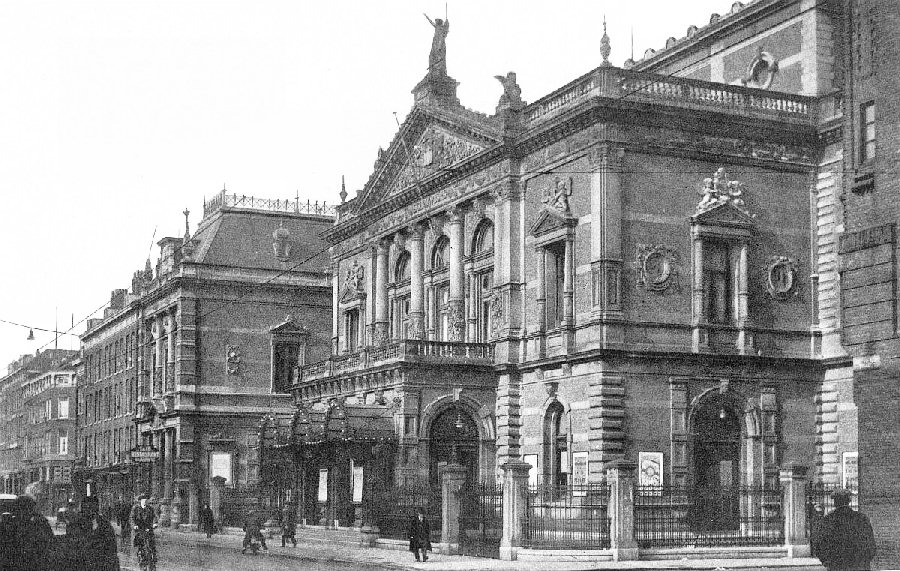
Groote Schouwburg, Rotterdam (1930)

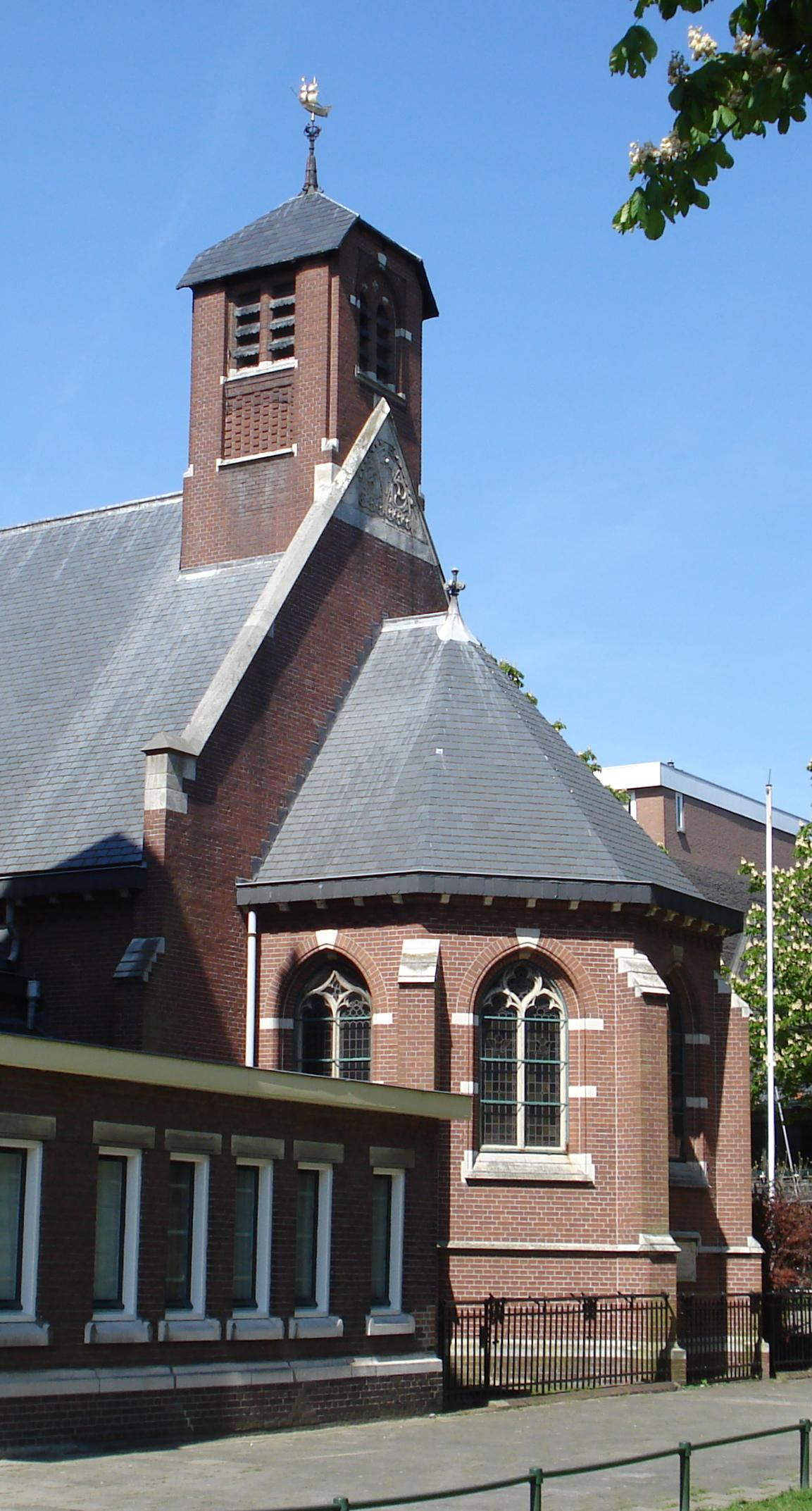
St Mary's Church, Rotterdam (1913)
