= Delfshaven =

Borough of Rotterdam, Netherlands

Coordinates: 51°54′26″N 4°26′54″E

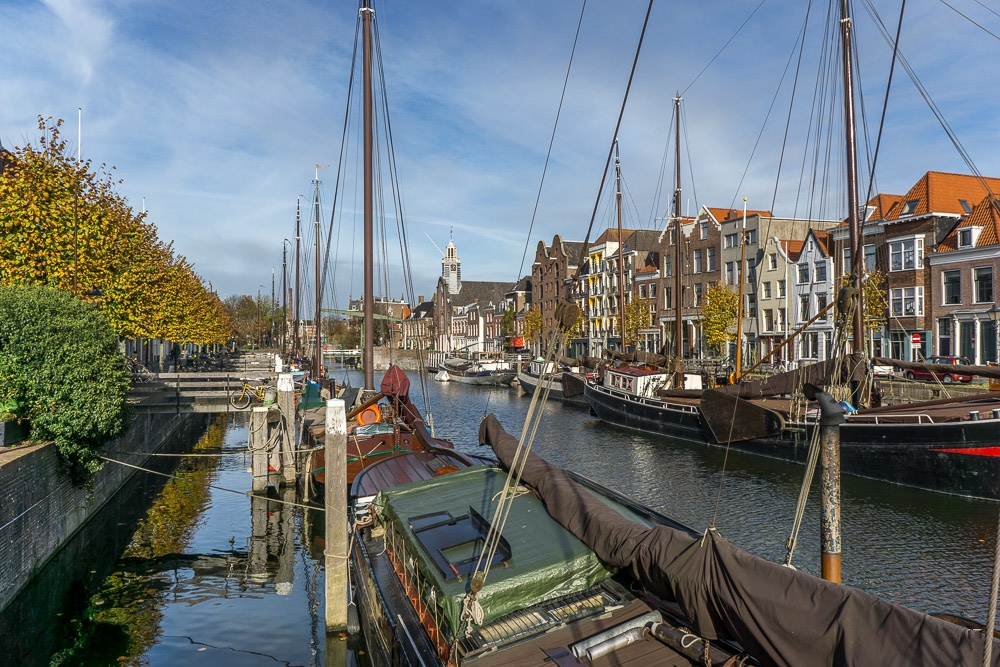
View of the harbour of Delfshaven as it appears today.

Delfshaven (Dutch pronunciation: [ˌdɛl(ə)fsˈɦaːvə(n)]) is a borough of Rotterdam, Netherlands, on the right bank of river Nieuwe Maas. It was a separate municipality until 1886.

The town of Delfshaven grew around the port of the city of Delft. Delft itself was not located on a major river, so in 1389 a harbour was created about 12 km (7 mi) due south of the city, to be able to receive seafaring vessels and avoid tolls being levied by the neighbouring and competing city of Rotterdam. This settlement was named "Delfshaven" (lit. 'Port of Delft').

On 1 August 1620 the Pilgrim fathers left Delfshaven with the Speedwell. Since then, the town's Oude Kerk has also been known as the Pelgrimskerk, or in English, the "Pilgrim Fathers Church".

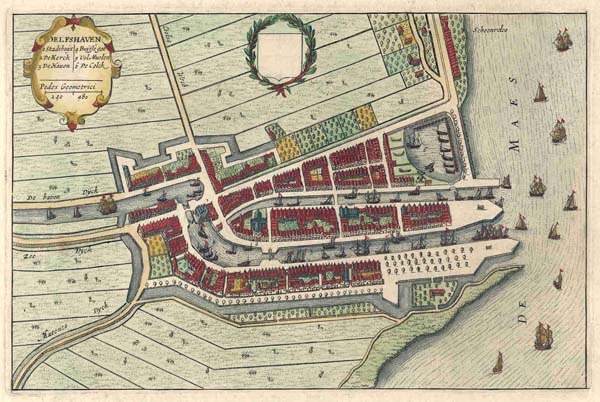
Delfshaven, in Joan Blaeu's collection Tooneel der Steeden, 1649

Fishing, shipbuilding and the distillery of jenever were the main sources of income. The Dutch East India Company had important wharves and warehouses in Delfshaven, and one of the Dutch West India Company's most famous commanders, Piet Hein, was born here.

Delfshaven belonged to the city and municipality of Delft until 1795, when it declared itself to be an independent municipality, under protest from Delft. In 1825 it got city rights. Delfshaven was annexed by Rotterdam in 1886 at its own request. The current borough has about 73,000 inhabitants. Its small historic centre has been carefully preserved. It features modest local museums, a brewery and various dining and drinking facilities.

Delfshaven escaped the bombing of Rotterdam by the Luftwaffe on 14 May 1940. Later during the Second World War, the area around the Visserijplein and other parts of the western city of Rotterdam were destroyed by Allied bombing on 31 March 1943.

== See also ==
- St Mary's Church, Rotterdam, Anglican church in Delfshaven
