= Jonathan (name) =

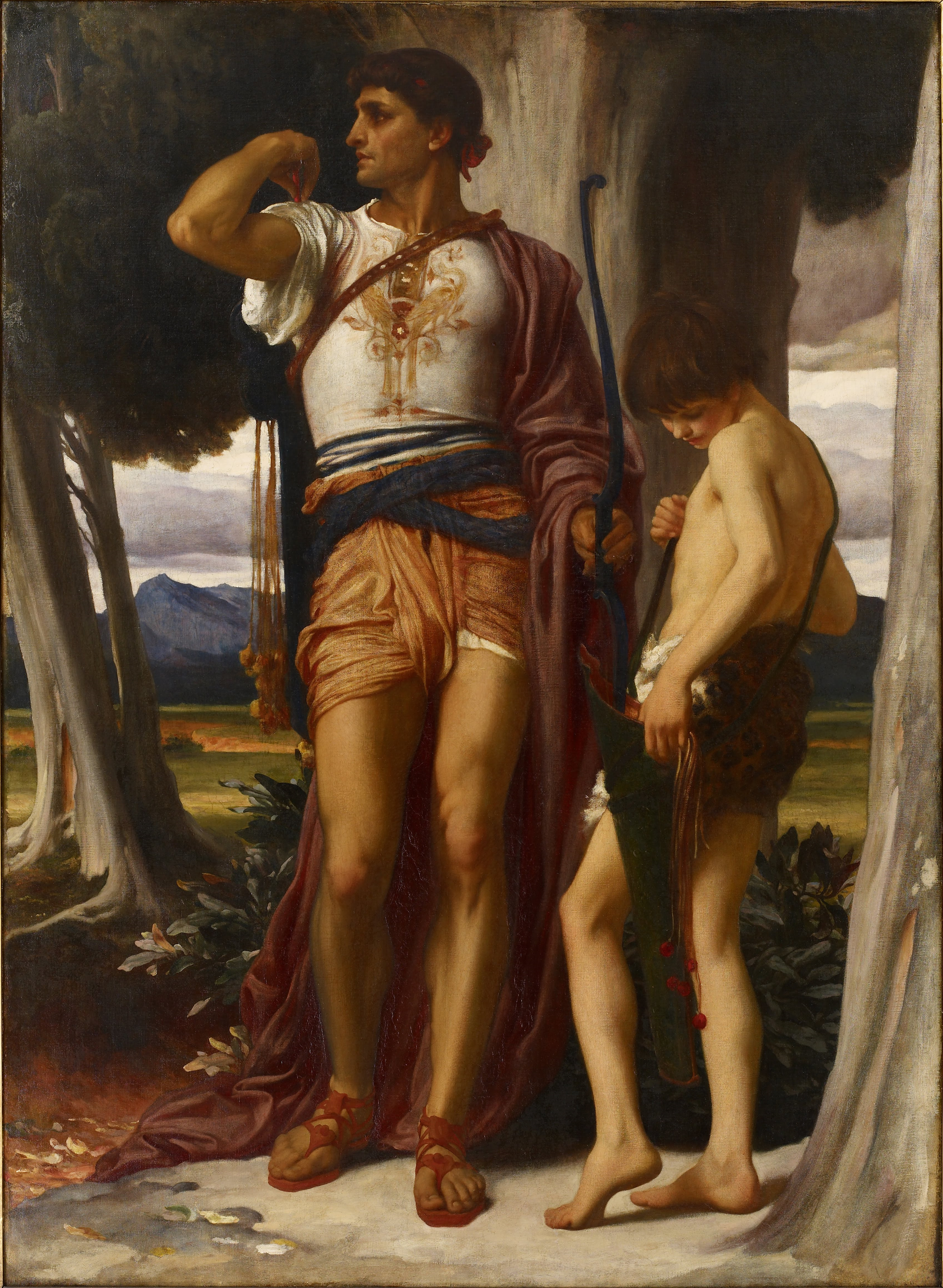
- 19th-century portrait of Jonathan by Frederic Leighton
- Pronunciation: English: /ˈdʒɒnəθən/ JON-ə-thən; Finnish: [ˈjoːnɑtɑn] Dutch: [ˈjoːnaːtɑn] French: [ʒɔnatɑ̃] German: [ˈjoːnatan] Spanish: [ˈɟʝonatan]
- Gender: Male
- Language: English
- Name day: Finland: 26 January, France: 1 March, United States: 26 April, Sweden: 22 December, Germany: 29 December

Origin
- Origin: Hebrew
- Meaning: "God has given"

Other names
- Nicknames: Jon; Jonny; Jony
- Related names: Jon; Jonatan; Jonatas; Nathan; Nathanael; Nathaniel

Jonathan (Hebrew: יְהוֹנָתָן/יוֹנָתָן, Standard: Yehōnatan/Yōnatan, Tiberian: Yŏhōnāṯān/Yōnāṯān) is a common name given to males which means "YHWH has given" in Hebrew. The earliest known use of the name was in the Bible; one Jonathan was the son of King Saul, a close friend of David.

Variants of Jonathan include Jonatan, Djonathan. Biblical variants include Yehonathan, Y'honathan, Yhonathan, Yonathan, Yehonatan, Yonatan, Yonaton, Yonoson, Yeonoson or Yehonasan. In Israel, "Yoni" is a common nickname for Yonatan (Jonathan) in the same way Jonny is in English.

The name was the 31st-most-popular boys' name in the United States in 2011, according to the SSA.

== List of alternatives ==
- Arabic: يوناثان, جوناثان
- Amharic: ዮናታን
- Aramaic:
  - Assyrian Neo-Aramaic: ܝܘܿܢܵܕ݂ܵܡ, romanized: Yōnāḏām
  - Classical Syriac: ܝܘܢܬܢ, romanized: Yōnāṯān
  - Targumic Imperial Aramaic: יוֹנָתָן, romanized: Yônāṯān
- Armenian: Հովնաթան, romanized: Hovnatan
- Chinese: 乔纳森 (simplified), 喬納森 (traditional), romanized: Qiáonàsēn (Qiáo'nà'sēn)
- Czech: Jonatán, Jonatan
- Croatian: Jonatan
- Dutch: Jonathan, Jonatan
- Estonian: Joonatan
- Fijian: Jonacani
- Filipino: Jonathan
- Finnish: Joonatan
- French: Jonathan
- Georgian: იონათანი, romanized: ionatani
- German: Jonathan, Jonatan
- Greek: Ιωνάθαν, romanized: Ionáthan
- Hawaiian: Ionakana
- Hebrew: יהונתן, romanized: Yehonatan
- Hungarian: Jonatán
- Icelandic: Jónatan, Jonathan
- Indonesian: Yonatan, Jonathan
- Irish: Seanachán, Ionatán
- Italian: Gionata
- Japanese: ヨナタン, romanized: Yonatan
- Korean: 요나단, romanized: Yonadan
- Latin: Ionathan, Ionathas
- Lithuanian: Jonatanas
- Māori: Honatana
- Persian: جاناتان
- Polish: Jonatan, Jonathan
- Portuguese: Jónatas, Jônatas, Jonatão
- Romanian: Ionatan, Ion
- Russian: Ионафан, romanized: Ionafan
- Samoan: Ionatana
- Slovak: Jonatán
- Spanish: Jonatán, Yónathan
- Swedish: Jonatan
- Tongan: Sonatane
- Tigrinya: ዮናታን
- Yoruba: Jonatani

== A ==
- Jonathan Aaron (born 1941), American poet
- Jonathan Clement Abalos (born 1994), Filipino representative
- Jonathan Abbatt, Canadian chemist
- Jonathan Aberdein (born 1998), South African racing driver
- Jonathan Abrahams, American television writer and producer
- Jonathan Abramowitz (born 1969), American clinical psychologist
- Jonathan Abrams, Canadian engineer
- Jonathan Abrams, American television writer
- Jonathan Ackley, American video game designer
- Jonathan Adams, multiple people
- Jonathan Addison (born 1965), English cricketer
- Jonathan Addleton (born 1957), American diplomat and author
- Jonathan Adelstein, American politician
- Jonathan Adendorf (born 1985), South African rugby union player
- Jonathan Adiri (born 1982), Israeli businessman
- Jonathan Adler (born 1966), American potter, interior decorator, and author
- Jonathan Afolabi (born 2000), Irish footballer
- Jonathan Agnew (born 1960), English cricketer and broadcaster
- Jonathan Agudelo (born 1992), Colombian footballer
- Jonathan Águila (born 1990), Salvadoran footballer
- Jonathan Ahdout (born 1989), American actor
- Jonathan Aibel (born 1969), American screenwriter and producer along with Glenn Berger
- Jonathan Aiello (born 1998), American freestyle wrestler
- Jonathan Aitken (born 1942), British politician
- Jonathan Ajayi, English actor
- Jonathan Aka (born 1986), French basketball player
- Jonathan Akamba (born 2000), known as Akamz, French dancer, comedian and social media personality
- Jonathan Akpoborie (born 1968), Nigerian former football forward
- Jonathan Albaladejo (born 1982), Puerto Rican baseball player
- Jonathan Alberts, Canadian-American film editor
- Jonathan Albon (born 1989), British runner
- Jonathan Alden Sr. (c. 1632–1697), Plymouth colonist and son of Mayflower immigrants
- Jonathan Alder (1773–1849), American settler
- Jonathan Aldrich (1936–2021), American poet
- Jonathan Allen (born 1995), American football player
- Jonathan Lazare Alperin (1937–2025), American mathematician
- Jonathan Ames (born 1964), American author, columnist and showrunner
- Jonathan Amon (born 1999), American soccer player
- Jonathan Amos, British film editor
- Jonathan Ancer (born 1970), South African journalist
- Jonathan Anderson (born 1984), Irish fashion designer
- Jonathan Anderson (born 1991), American football player
- Jonathan Andic (born 1981), Spanish businessman
- Jonathan Ansell (born 1982), English singer
- Jonathan Antin, American businessman
- Jonathan Antoine (born 1995), English classically trained tenor
- Jonathan Apphus, Leader of the Hasmonean dynasty from 160 to 143 BCE
- Jonathan Appell, American stonework restorer
- Jonathan Arac, American literary scholar
- Jonathan Aranda (born 1998), Mexican baseball player
- Jonathan Araúz (born 1998), Panamanian baseball player
- Jonathan Arendse, South African politician
- Jonathan Arias (born 1986), Mexican footballer
- Jonathan Arias (born 1997), Salvadoran para cross-country skier
- Jonathan Aris, English actor
- Jonathan Arnold (1741–1793), American politician
- Jonathan Earle Arnold (1814 – 1869), American politician and lawyer
- Jonathan Arnott (born 1981), Brexit Party politician
- Jonathan Aro (born 1990), Dominican baseball player
- Jonathan Arons (born 1943), American astrophysicist
- Jonathan Aronson, American academic
- Jonathan Arkush (born 1954), British barrister and Jewish community leader
- Jonathan Asake (born 1965), Nigerian politician
- Jonathan Asbridge, English nurse
- Jonathan Ash-Edwards (born 1986–87), British politician
- Jonathan Ashe (fl. 1813), Irish masonic writer
- Jonathan Ashmore (born 1948), British physicist
- Jonathan Ashworth (born 1978), British politician
- Jonathan Asp (born 1990), Swedish footballer
- Jonathan Aspas (born 1982), Spanish footballer
- Jonathan Aspirot (born 1999), Canadian ice hockey player
- Jonathan Aspropotamitis (born 1996), Australian professional footballer
- Jonathan Asselin (born 1958), Canadian equestrian
- Jonathan Assous (born 1983), French-Israeli footballer
- Jonathan Åstrand (born 1985), Finnish sprinter
- Jonathan Atkins (c. 1610–1703), Governor of Guernsey and Governor of Barbados
- Jonathan Atkinson (born 1972), English footballer
- Jonathan Atsu (born 1996), French swimmer
- Jonathan Attard (born 1984), Maltese lawyer and politician
- Jonathan Augustinsson (born 1996), Swedish footballer
- Jonathan Auxier (born 1981), Canadian writer
- Jonathan Austin (1830–1892), American veteran, politician, and businessman
- Jonathan Austyn, British academic
- Jonathan Avery, American psychiatrist and academic
- Jonathan Axelrod (1949–2024), American producer and screenwriter
- Jonathan Ayala (born 1992), Puerto Rican wrestler
- Jonathan Ayité (born 1985), Togolese footballer
- Jonathan Azulay (born 1993), Swedish footballer

== B ==
- Jonathan Babineaux (born 1981), American football player
- Jonathan Bach, American academic
- Jonathan Bachini (born 1975), Italian former footballer
- Jonathan Backhouse (1849–1918), English banker
- Jonathan Backhouse (1779–1842), English banker
- Jonathan Baell, Australian medicinal chemist
- Jonathan Bagger (born 1955), American theoretical physicist
- Jonathan Friedrich Bahmaier (1774–1841), German theologian and hymnwriter
- Jonathan Bailey (1940–2008), English Anglican bishop
- Jonathan Bailey (born 1988), English actor
- Jonathan Baillie (born 1985), Scottish footballer
- Jonny Bairstow (born 1989), English cricketer
- Jonathan Baker (born 1966), Church of England bishop
- Jonathan Baker (born 1959), British racing driver
- Jonathan Baker (born 1955), British judge
- Jonathan Baker Moore (1825 – 1889), American businessman, politician, and pioneer
- Jonathan Balcombe (born 1959), British ethologist
- Jonathan Ball (born 1947), Co-founder of the Eden Project
- Jonathan Ball, British virologist
- Jonathan Ball (born 1985), Bermudian footballer
- Jonathan Balls (1769–1846), English serial killer
- Jonathan Balotelli (born 1989), Brazilian association football player
- Jonathan Bamaiyi, Anglican bishop
- Jonathan Bamba (born 1996), Ivorian footballer
- Jonathan Bamber, British physicist
- Jonathan Bane (born 1991), American football player
- Jonathan Banks (born 1947), American actor
- Jonathan Barasa (1916 – 1996), Kenyan chief
- Jonathan Barbe (born 1977), Seychellois windsurfer
- Jonathan Barboza (born 1990), Uruguayan football player
- Jonathan Bardon (1941–2020), Irish historian and author
- Jonathan Bardottier (born 1992), Mauritian sprinter
- Jonathan Barker (died 2018), Canadian film producer
- Jonathan Barnes (born 1942), British historian and philosopher
- Jonathan Barnes, British writer
- Jonathan Barnet (1677/78 – 1745), English privateer
- Jonathan Barnett (born 1950), British football agent
- Jonathan Barnett (born 1955), American businessman and politician
- Jonathan Quinn Barnett (born 1964), American super yacht designer
- Jonathan Baron (born 1944), American psychologist
- Jonathan Barragán (born 1985), Spanish motorcycle racer
- Jonathan Barreiro (born 1997), Spanish basketball player
- Jonathan Barrios (born 1985), Salvadoran footballer
- Jonathan Barron (born 1937), English snooker player
- Jonathan Barry (born 1988), Bahamian cricketer
- Jonathan B. Barry (born 1945), American politician
- Jonathan Bartley (born 1971), British politician, former co-leader of the Green Party
- Jonathan Bate (born 1958), British author, scholar and critic
- Jonathan Bates (1939–2008), English sound engineer
- Jonathan Bateson (born 1989), English footballer
- Jonathan Battishill (1738–1801), English composer, keyboardist and singer
- Jonathan Batty (born 1974), English cricketer
- Jonathan Beale, British philosopher
- Jonathan Bean (born 1979), American children's book author and illustrator
- Jonathan Bean (born 1964), English cricketer
- Jonathan Beard (born 1981), American orchestrator and composer
- Jonathan Beasley, American football player and coach
- Jonathan Beaulieu (born 1993), French footballer
- Jonathan Beaulieu-Bourgault (born 1988), Canadian soccer player
- Jonathan Beaulieu-Cyr, Canadian film director
- Jonathan Beaulieu-Richard (1994–2022), Canadian football player
- Jonathan Mock Beck (1935–2006), American mathematician
- Jonathan Beckett (born 1957), British yacht broker
- Jonathan Beckman, British journalist and historian
- Jonathan Beecher (born 1937), American historian
- Jonathan Béhé (born 1989), French footballer
- Jonathan Belcher (1682–1757), American merchant and politician
- Jonathan Belcher (1710–1776), Canadian politician
- Jonathan Bell (born 1970), North Irish politician
- Jonathan Beller, American film theorist
- Jonathan Bellis (born 1998), Manx cyclist
- Jonathan Bellman (born 1957), American musicologist
- Jonathan Benair (1950–1998), American actor
- Jonathan ben Uzziel, Judean Talmudic rabbi
- Jonathan Bender (born 1981), American basketball player
- Jonathan Bennett, multiple people
- Jonathan Benteke (born 1995), Belgian footballer
- Jonathan Bepler, American composer
- Jonathan Berger (born 1954), American composer
- Jonathan Bergmann, American chemistry teacher
- Jonathan Berk, Academic
- Jonathan Berkey, American historian
- Jonathan Berman, American film producer, director, screenwriter, and academic
- Jonathan Bermúdez (born 1995), Puerto Rican baseball player
- Jonathan Bernier (born 1988), Canadian ice hockey player
- Jon Bernthal (born 1976), American actor
- Jonathan Berry (born 1953), Canadian chess player
- Jonathan Berry (born 1970), British peer
- Jonathan Biabiany (born 1988), French footballer
- Jonathan Bibi (born 1984), Seychellois football player
- Jonathan Bielby (born 1944), English cathedral organist and composer
- Jonathan Biggins, Australian actor, singer, writer and comedian
- Jonathan Bii, Kenyan politician
- Jonathan Bilbao (born 1999), Venezuelan-Peruvian footballer
- Jonathan B. Bingham (1914–1986), American politician and diplomat
- Jonathan Bing (born 1970), American attorney and politician
- Jonathan Binney (1723/24–1807), Canadian politician
- Jonathan Binns (1747–1818), English Quaker and abolitionist
- Jonathan Binns Were (1809–1885), Australian politician and stockbroker
- Jonathan P. Binstock, American curator and museum director
- Jonathan Biran (born 1966), American judge
- Jonathan Birch, multiple people
- Jonathan Bird (born 1969), American underwater cinematographer and television host
- Jonathan Bird (born 2001), South African cricketer
- Jonathan Biss (born 1980), American pianist
- Jonathan Bixby (1959–2001), American costume designer
- Jonathan Black, British author
- Jonathan Black (1966–2023), British art historian
- Jonathan Blanchard (1811–1892), American pastor and educator
- Jonathan Blanchard (1738–1788), American politician
- Jonathan Bland (born 2005), Welsh footballer
- Jonathan Blair (1941–2017), American photographer
- Jonathan Blake (born 1987), American professional basketball player
- Jonathan Blake (born 1949), British gay rights activist
- Jonathan Blake (born 1956), British archbishop
- Jonathan Blanco (born 1987), Argentine footballer
- Jonathan Blanes (born 1987), Uruguayan footballer
- Jonathan Blewitt (1782–1853), English composer
- Jonathan Bliss (1742–1822), Canadian politician
- Jonathan Blitstein, American dramatist
- Jonathan Blitzer, American journalist and writer
- Jonathan Blondel (born 1984), Belgian footballer
- Jonathan Blow (born 1971), American game designer and programmer
- Jonathan Blum (born 1967), American writer
- Jonathan Blum (born 1972), American writer
- Jonathan Boakes (born 1973), British video game designer
- Jonathan Boardman (born 1963), British Anglican priest
- Jonathan Bobaljik, Canadian linguist
- Jonathan Bolanos (born 1998), American soccer player
- Jonathan Bolaños (born 1978), Costa Rican footballer
- Jonathan Bolingi (born 1994), Congolese footballer
- Jonathan Bomarito (born 1982), American racing driver
- Jonathan Bond (born 1993), English footballer
- Jonathan Borden (born 1962), American neurosurgeon
- Jonathan Borja (born 1994), Ecuadorian footballer
- Jonathan Borlee (born 1988), Belgian athlete
- Jonathan Bornstein (born 1984), American soccer player
- Jonathan Borofsky (born 1942), American sculptor and printmaker
- Jonathan Borwein (1951–2016), Scottish mathematician
- Jonathan Bowden (1962–2012), English political activist
- Jonathan Philbin Bowman (1969–2000), Irish broadcaster and journalist
- Jonathan Brace (1754–1837), American politician
- Jonathan Bradshaw (born 1944), British academic
- Jonathan Brady (born 2003), American football player
- Jonathan P. Braga (born 1969), US Army general
- Jonathan Bragdon (born 1944), American artist
- Jonathan Brandis (1976–2003), American actor
- Jonathan Branton, British lawyer
- Jonathan Brash, British politician
- Jonathan P. Brazee (born 1958), American novelist
- Jonathan Brearley (born 1973), English businessman
- Jonathan Breck, American actor
- Jonathan Bree (born 1979), New Zealand singer-songwriter and producer
- Jonathan Brent (born 1949), American academic, author, and publisher
- Jonathan Brewer (born 1987), American football coach
- Jonathan Brewster (1593–1659), American settler
- Jonathan Breyne (born 1991), Belgian cyclist
- Jonathan Bricker, American clinical psychologist
- Jonathan Brill (born 1967), American business futurist, keynote speaker, and author
- Jonathan Brison (born 1983), French footballer
- Jonathan Brown, several people
- Jonathan Browning, American interior designer and business executive
- Jonathan Browning (1805–1879), American inventor and gunmaker
- Jonathan Browning (born 1959), British businessman
- Jonathan Brookins (born 1985), American mixed martial arts fighter
- Jonathan Brooks (1774–1855), inaugural Archdeacon of Liverpool
- Jonathan Broom-Edwards (born 1988), British Paralympic athlete
- Jonathan Broomhead (born 1995), South African professional golfer
- Jonathan Brossard, French computer scientist
- Jonathan Brostoff (1983–2024), American politician
- Jonathan Brough, New Zealand-Australian film and TV director
- Jonathan Broughton (born 1969), British swimmer
- Jonathan Browne (1601–1643), English clergyman
- Jonathan Browne (born 2000), Irish racing driver
- Jonny Brownlee (born 1990), British triathlete
- Jonathan Broxton (born 1984), American baseball player
- Jonathan Bru (born 1985), Mauritian footballer
- Jonathan Brugh, New Zealand actor and comedian
- Jonathan Buatu (born 1993), Portuguese footballer
- Jonathan Buck (1719–1795), American town founder
- Jonathan Buckley (born 1991), Northern Irish politician
- Jonathan Buckley (born 1956), British writer
- Jonny Buckland (born 1977), British musician
- Jonathan Bullard (born 1993), American football player
- Jonathan Bullock (born 1963), British politician
- Jonathan Buma, Former FBI agent
- Jonathan Bumbu (born 1999), French footballer
- Jonathan Burkardt (born 2000), German footballer
- Jonathan Burn (born 1939), British actor
- Jonathan Burrows, British choreographer
- Jonathan Bush (1931–2021), American banker
- Jonathan Bushe (born 1978), Irish cricketer
- Jonathan Bushnell (born 2001), English cricketer
- Jonathan Butler (born 1961), South African singer-songwriter and guitarist
- Jonathan Butler (born 1945), American historian
- Jonathan Butterell, English choreographer and director
- Jonathan Simba Bwanga (born 2000), Congolese footballer
- Jonathan Bydlak, American Independent Political Consultant/ Lobbyist
- Jonathan Byrd (born 1978), American professional golfer
- Jonathan Byrd (born 1970), American singer-songwriter

== C ==
- Jonathan Cafú (born 1991), Brazilian footballer
- Jonathan Cahn (born 1959), American author and Messianic Rabbi
- Jonathan Caicedo (born 1993), Ecuadorian cyclist
- Jonathan Caicedo (born 1996), Ecuadorian footballer
- Jonathan Cain (born 1950), American rock musician
- Jonathan Caine (born 1966), British political advisor and peer
- Jonathan Cainer (1957–2016), British astrologer
- Jonathan Cairney (born 1971), Scottish musician and actor
- Jonathan Cake (born 1967), English actor
- Jonathan Calderwood, Northern Irish football groundskeeper
- Jonathan Caldwell (born 1984), Northern Irish golfer
- Jonathan G. Callahan, American politician
- Jonathan Calleri (born 1993), Argentine footballer
- Jonathan Calm (born 1971), American visual artist
- Jonathan Calvert, British investigative journalist
- Jonathan Campbell (born 1964), British theologian
- Jonathan Campbell (born 1993), American soccer player
- Jonathan A. Campbell (born 1947), American herpetologist
- Jonathan D. Campbell, American composer and author
- Jonathan Cannon (born 2000), American baseball player
- Jonathan Cannon, American environmental lawyer
- Jonathan Cansino (1939–2006), English international bridge player
- Jonathan Canter (born 1965), American tennis player
- Jonathan Cantillana (born 1992), Palestinian footballer
- Jonathan Cantwell (1982–2018), Australian cyclist
- Jonathan Caouette, American film director
- Jonathan Cape (1793–1868), English mathematician and cleric
- Jonathan Capehart (born 1967), American journalist and television personality
- Jonathan Carapetis (born 1961), Australian paediatric physician
- Jonathan Carbe (born 1990), Swedish decathlete
- Jonathan Caren, American playwright and TV writer
- Jonathan Carlsbogård (born 1995), Swedish handball player
- Jonathan Carlsson (born 1988), Swedish ice hockey defenceman
- Jonathan Carroll (born 1949), American fiction writer
- Jonathan Cash (born 1980), American racing driver
- Jonathan Casillas (born 1987), American football player
- Jonathan Casper, American politician
- Jonathan Castagna (born 2005), Canadian ice hockey player
- Jonathan Castillo (born 2001), Venezuelan footballer
- Jonathan Castillo (born 1993), Argentine footballer
- Jonathan Castroviejo (born 1987), Spanish cyclist
- Jonathan Cecil (1939–2011), English actor
- Jonathan Cerullo (born 1960), American director and choreographer
- Jonathan Chace (1829 – 1917), American politician
- Jonathan Chaffee (born 1944), American biathlete
- Jonathan Chaffey (born 1962), British Church of England priest
- Jonathan Chait, American political commentator
- Jonathan Chan (born 1997), Singaporean former diver
- Jonathan Chang (born 1991), Taiwanese actor
- Jonathan Chapman (1807–1848), American politician
- Jonathan Chapman (born 1974), British ecologist
- Jonathan Charney (1943–2002), American academic
- Jonathan Charquero (born 1989), Uruguayan footballer
- Jonathan Chase (born 1979), American actor
- Jonathan Chase (1732–1800), American Revolutionary War soldier
- Jonathan Lyndon Chase (born 1989), American visual artist
- Jonathan Cheban (born 1974), American reality TV personality and entrepreneur
- Jonathan Cheechoo (born 1980), Canadian ice hockey player
- Jonathan Cheever (born 1985), American snowboarder
- Jonathan Cherki (born 1986), French entrepreneur and CEO
- Jonathan Cherry (born 1978), Canadian actor
- Jonathan Cheung (born 1981), Chinese actor
- Jonathan Chik, Hong Kong television producer, director, and writer
- Jonathan Child (1785–1860), American businessman and politician
- Jonathan Chimier (born 1982), Mauritian long jumper
- Jonathan Chipalo (born 1962), Zambian sprinter
- Jonathan Chu (born 1983), American tennis player
- Jonathan Chua (born 1990), Singaporean actor and singer
- Jonathan Church (born 1967), British stage director
- Jonathan Cilley (1802–1838), American politician
- Jonathan Cirtain, American physicist
- Jonathan Cissé (born 1997), Ivorian footballer
- Jonathan Cisternas (born 1980), Chilean footballer
- Jonathan Clauss (born 1992), French footballer
- Jonathan Clancy (born 1986), Irish hurler
- Jonathan Clark, several people
- Jonathan Claussen, American politician from Minnesota
- Jonathan Clay, American singer-songwriter
- Jonathan Clayden (born 1968), British organic chemist and professor
- Jonathan Clements (born 1971), British author and scriptwriter
- Jonathan Clements (1963–2025), British financial journalist and author
- Jonathan Cleveland (born 1970), Canadian swimmer
- Jonathan Clift, British rower
- Jonathan Clinkscale (born 1982), American football player
- Jonathan Coachman (born 1973), American sports anchor and professional wrestling personality
- Jonathan Coates (born 1975), Welsh footballer
- Jonathan Cochet (born 1977), French racing driver
- Jonathan Cockcroft (born 1977), English cricketer
- Jonathan Coddington (born c. 1992), American football coach
- Jonathan A. Coddington, American museum scientist and biologist
- Jonathan Coe (born 1971), English novelist
- Jonathan Coeffic (born 1981), French rower
- Jonathan Coggan (born 1983), British wheelchair rugby player
- Jonathan Cohen, several people
- Jonathan Cohler (born 1959), American classical clarinetist
- Jonathan Cohn (born 1969), American author and journalist
- Jonathan Cole, several people
- Jonathan Coleman, several people
- Jonathan Collier, American television writer
- Jonathan Collins (born 1961), Australian rules footballer
- Jonathan Collomb-Patton (born 1979), French snowboarder
- Jonathan Comer, American psychologist
- Jonathan Compas (born 1986), American football player
- Jonathan Condy (1770–1828), American lawyer
- Jonathan Conneely (born 1980), American entrepreneur, author and motivational speaker
- Jonathan Hudson Connell, American electrical engineer
- Jonathan Conricus (born 1979), Israeli military personnel
- Jonathan Cook (born c. 1965), British journalist
- Jonathan Cook (born 1989), Australian cricketer
- Jonathan Cooper, multiple people
- Jonathan Cope (born 1963), British ballet dancer
- Jonathan Cope (1664–1694), British landowner and politician
- Jonathan Copete, (born 1988), Colombian footballer
- Jonathan Coppess, American government official
- Jonathan Corbblah (born 1979), American game show competitor and chess master
- Jonathan Corbett, British TV food channel presenter and food commentator
- Jonathan Coret (born 1989), Mauritian weightlifter
- Jonathan Webster Cornett (1883–1973), Canadian politician
- Jonathan Correia Da Fonseca (born 1994), Monégasque footballer
- Jonathan Coulton (born 1970), American singer-songwriter
- Jonathan Corwin (1640–1718), New England Judge of the Salem witch trials
- Jonathan Crary, American art critic
- Jonathan Craig, Northern Irish politician
- Jonathan Crane (1750–1820), Canadian politician
- Jonathan Craven (born 1965), American writer and director
- Jonathan Crawford (born 1990), Scottish footballer
- Jonathon Crawford (born 1991), American professional baseball player
- Jonathan Crenshaw (1972–2023), American artist
- Jonathan Cristol, American academic, professor, and commentator
- Jonathan Croall (born 1941), British author and journalist
- Jonathan Crocker (1874–1944), English cricketer
- Jonathan Crombie (1966–2015), Canadian actor and voice actor
- Jonathan Crompton (born 1987), American gridiron football player and coach
- Jonathan Cross (born 1961), British musicologist
- Jonathan Cross (born 1975), English footballer
- Jonathan Crow (born 1977), Canadian violinist
- Jonathan Crowe (born 1979), Australian legal philosopher
- Jonathan Crowther, British crossword compiler
- Jonathan Crowther (1853–1926), Boer war general
- Jonathan Crowther (1794–1856), English church minister in India
- Jonathan Cubero (born 1994), Uruguayan footballer
- Jonathan Cuenú (born 1986), Colombian footballer
- Jonathan Cullen (born 1960), British actor
- Jonathan Culler (born 1944), American novelist and critic
- Jonathan Culp (born 1971), Canadian media creator
- Jonathan Cummins, Canadian musician and record producer
- Jonathan Curiel (born 1960), American journalist
- Jonathan P. Cushing (1793–1835), American college president

== D ==
- Jonathan Dahlén (born 1997), Swedish ice hockey player
- Jonathan Dakin (born 1973), English cricketer
- Jonathan Dally, American football player
- Jonathan Daly (born 1942), American actor
- Jonathan Dancy (born 1946), British philosopher
- Jonathan Daniels (1939–1965), Episcopal seminarian and civil rights activist
- Jonathan Danilowitz (1945–2022), Israeli activist
- Jonathan Danty (born 1992), French rugby union player
- Jonathan Darlington (born 1956), British conductor
- Jonathan Dasnières de Veigy (born 1987), French tennis player
- Jonathan Daugherty (??–1856), American politician
- Jonathan David (born 2000), professional soccer player
- Jonathan Davenport (born 1983), American racing driver
- Jonathan Davies (born 1988), Welsh rugby union player
- Jonathan Ceredig Davies (1859–1932), Welsh traveler and writer
- Jonathan Davis (born 1971), American musician
- Jonathan Davis (born 1992), American baseball player
- Jonathan Davis (born 1954), British author, editor and journalist
- Jonathan Davis (born 1988), Bahamian sprinter
- Jonathan Davis (born 1960), British fencer
- Jonathan Daviss (born 2000), American actor
- Jonathan Dawson ( 1941–2013), Australian academic and film maker
- Jonathan Dayton ( 1760 – 1824), American founding father and politician
- Jonathan de Amo (born 1990), Spanish footballer
- Jonathan De Castro (born 1988), Dominican racing driver
- Jonathan de Falco (born 1984), Belgian footballer and pornographic actor
- Jonathan de Guzmán (born 1987), Netherlands international footballer
- Jonathan de Guzman (born 1987), Canadian-Dutch footballer
- Jonathan de León (born 1987), Mexican footballer
- Jonathan de Marte (born 1993), American baseball player
- Jonathan de Souza Santos (born 1990), Brazilian Paralympic athlete
- Jonathan Dean (born 1997), American soccer player
- Jonathan Dean (1924–2014), American career diplomat
- Jonathan Deans (born 1954), American sound designer
- Jonathan Decoste, Canadian cinematographer
- Jonathan Dee (born 1962), American author
- Jonathan DeFelice, American Catholic priest and college president
- Jonathan Dekker (born 1983), American football player
- Jonathan Del Arco (born 1966), American actor
- Jonathan Delaplace (born 1986), French footballer
- Jonathan Dele ( 1944–2017), Nigerian boxer
- Jonathan Delisle ( 1977–2006), Canadian ice hockey player
- Jonathan Demme (1944–2017), American filmmaker
- Jonathan Denis (born 1975), Canadian politician
- Jonathan Denning (born 1991), Welsh cricketer
- Jonathan Dennis (1953–2002), New Zealand film archivist, broadcaster and writer
- Jonathan Desbiens, Canadian film maker
- Jonathan Destin ( 1994–2022), French writer
- Jonathan Dever, American politician
- Jonathan Dewald, American historian
- Jonathan Dewes (born 1995), English cricketer
- Jonathan Di Bella (born 1986), Italian-Canadian kickboxer
- Jonathan Diaz (born 1985), American football player
- Jonathan Diaz (born 1990), Mexican footballer
- Jonathan Dibben (born 1994), British cyclist
- Jonathan Dickinson (1663–1722), American mayor and writer
- Jonathan Dickinson (1688–1747), American minister and co-founder of Princeton University
- Jonathan Dimbleby (born 1944), British presenter
- Jonathan Dismang (born 1979), American politician
- Jonathan Dixon, multiple people
- Jonathan Docking (born 1964), Australian rugby league footballer
- Jonathan Dokuchitz, American actor
- Jonathan Dolan (born 1967), American politician
- Jonathan Dolan (born 1994), Irish badminton player
- Jonathan Dollimore (born 1948), British philosopher and critic
- Jonathan P. Dolliver ( 1858 – 1910), American politician
- Jonathan Domínguez (born 1987), Argentine-Chilean footballer
- Jonathan Donahue (born 1966), American musician
- Jonathan Donais (born 1979), American guitarist
- Jonathan Dordick (born 1959), American biochemist
- Jonathan Dorr Bradley (1803–1862), American lawyer and politician
- Jonathan Dory (born 1975), American Human Systems Integration Lead
- Jonathan dos Santos (born 1990), Mexican professional footballer
- Jonathan dos Santos (born 1992), Uruguayan footballer
- Jonathan Douglas (born 1981), Irish footballer
- Jonathan Douglas ( 1957–2022), Hong Kong broadcaster
- Jonathan Dourerassou (born 1989), French chess grandmaster
- Jonathan Dove (born 1959), English composer
- Jonathan Dow, English actor
- Jonathan Dowdall, Irish politician and kidnapper
- Jonathan Dowling (born 1991), American football player
- Jonathan Dowling (1955–2020), Irish-American physicist
- Jonathan Dubas (born 1991), Swiss professional basketball player
- Jonathan Dubasin (born 2000), Belgian footballer
- Jonathan Dube, American digital media executive
- Jonathan Dufrasne (born 1987), Belgian cyclist
- Jonathan Duhamel (born 1987), Canadian poker player
- Jonathan Duncan, multiple people
- Jonathan Dunford (born 1959), American violinist
- Jonathan Singletary Dunham (1640–1724), American settler
- Jonathan Dunn-Rankin (1930–2014), American actor
- Jonathan Dunnett (born 1974), British-Spanish adventurer, writer and windsurfing instructor
- Jonathan Dunsby (born 1953), British classical pianist and musicologist
- Jonathan Dyck, Canadian graphic novelist
- Jonathan Dymond (1796–1828), English Quaker and philosopher

== E ==
- Jonathan Earley, Australian navel officer
- Jonathan Eastwood (1823–1864), English clergyman and topographer
- Jonathan Eaton (1950–2024), American economist
- Jonathan Eddolls (born 1981), British engineer
- Jonathan Eddy (c. 1726–1804), American military officer and politician
- Jonathan Edewor (1942–2021), Pioneer Bishop of Anglican Diocese of Oleh
- Jonathan Edmondson (born 1959), British historian
- Jonathan Edouard (born 1996), American gridiron football player
- Jonathan Edvardsson (born 1997), Swedish handball player
- Jonathan Edwards, multiple people
- Jonathan Efron, American colorectal surgeon and hospital administrator
- Jonathan Egstad, special effects and software designer
- Jonathan Eig (born 1964), American journalist and biographer
- Jonathan Eisen (born 1986), American evolutionary biologist
- Jonathan Elias (born 1956), American composer
- Jonathan Elkus (born 1931), American composer
- Jonathan Ellery (born 1964), English artist
- Jonathan Elliot (1784–1846), English-American printer, newspaper editor, and publisher
- Jonathan Elliott (born 1962), American composer and teacher
- Jonathan Elmer ( 1745 – 1817), American politician
- Jonathan Elphick, British natural history writer
- Jonathan Elsom (born 1938), New Zealand politician
- Jonathan Elworthy (1936–2005), New Zealand politician
- Jonathan Emile (born 1986), Jamaican Canadian singer, rapper, record producer and cancer survivor
- Jonathan Emmett (born 1965), British children’s author
- Jonathan English, British filmmaker
- Jonathan A. Epstein, American cellular biologist and cardiologist
- Jonathan Erdmann (born 1988), German beach volleyball player
- Jonathan Ericsson (born 1984), Swedish ice hockey player
- Jonathan Erlich (born 1977), Israeli tennis player
- Jonathan Erlichman, Canadian baseball coach
- Jonathan Ernest, Mauritian footballer
- Jonathan Escoffery, American writer
- Jonathan España (born 1988), Venezuelan footballer
- Jonathan Esparza (born 1999), American soccer player
- Jonathan Espericueta (born 1994), Mexican footballer
- Jonathan Espínola (born 2002), Paraguayan footballer
- Jonathan Estabrooks (born 1983), Canadian record producer
- Jonathan Estreada (born 1983), Colombian footballer
- Jonathan Estreada (born 1998), Mexican footballer
- Jonathan Eusebio (born 1973), Filipino American director, stunt coordinator and actor
- Jonny Evans (born 1988), Northern Irish footballer
- Jonathan Evans (born 1958), British life peer
- Jonathan Evans, scholar
- Jonathan Evans (born 1950), British politician
- Jonathan Evans (born 1981), American football player
- Jonathan Evans (born 1992), Welsh rugby union player
- Jonathan Eybeschutz (1690–1764), Rabbi and Talmudist accused of secret Sabbatean beliefs
- Jonathan Eysseric (born 1990), French tennis player

== F ==
- Jonathan Fabbro (born 1982), Paraguayan footballer
- Jonathan Fahey, American lawyer and poitician
- Jonathan Fahn, American actor
- Jonathan Faiman (born 1969), American businessman
- Jonathan Fairbanks (1594–1668), English colonist
- Jonathan Leo Fairbanks (1933–2026), American artist and curator
- Jonathan Falconbridge Kelly (1817–c.1855), American journalist and humorist
- Jonathan Falkingham (born c. 1962), British architect and property developer
- Jonathan Falla (born 1954), English writer
- Jonathan Falwell (born 1966), American Baptist pastor
- Jonathan Famery (born 1988), French footballer
- Jonathan Faña (born 1987), Dominican footballer
- Jonathan Fanene (born 1982), American football player
- Jonathan Fantini Porter, United States Government official
- Jonathan Fanton (born 1943), American academic and nonprofit executive
- Jonathan Farías (born 1998), Argentine footballer
- Jonathan Farinha (born 1996), Trinidadian sprinter
- Jonathan Farnum (1939–2025), American politician
- Jonathan Farrow (born 1984), English cricketer
- Jonathan Farwell (1932–2025), American actor
- Jonathan Fast (born 1948), American author and social work teacher
- Jonathan Faull (born 1954), British official
- Jonathan Faulknor (fl.1744–1795), Royal Navy Admiral
- Jon Favreau (born 1966), American filmmaker and actor
- Jonathan Fawkner (born 1973), British visual effects artist
- Jonathan P. Fay (1757 or 1758–1836), American politician and medical doctor
- Jonathan Feinstein (born 1960), American economist
- Jonathan Felisaz (born 1985), French Nordic combined skier
- Jonathan Fellows-Smith (1932–2013), South African cricketer and rugby union player
- Jonathan Fenby (born 1942), British newspaper editor
- Jonathan Ferguson (born 1979), British firearm historian
- Jonathan Ferguson (1915–1974), Irish aviator and technician
- Jonathan Ferland (born 1983), Canadian professional ice hockey forward
- Jonathan Fernandez, American writer and producer
- Jonathan Figgis, Irish film director and producer
- Jonathan Figueira (born 1992), Argentine professional footballer
- Jonathan Figy (born 2001), Emirati cricketer
- Jonathan Fiifii'i (1921–1989), Solomon Islands politician
- Jonathan Filewich (born 1984), Canadian ice hockey player
- Jonathan Filipe (born 1999), American soccer player
- Jonathan Findley (born 1998), American racing driver
- Jonathan Fine (1931–2018), American physician and activist
- Jonathan Finlay (1948–2026), British paediatric neurooncologist
- Jonathan Firth (born 1967), English actor
- Jonathan Fisher (1768–1847), American religious leader, artist, farmer, and naturalist
- Jonathan Fisher (c. 1740–1809), Irish painter and engraver
- Jonathan Fisher (1757–1838), Archdeacon of Barnstaple
- Jonathan Fisher (fl. 2010s–2020s), English lawyer
- Jonathan Flatt (born 1994), English footballer
- Jonathan Flint, British behavior geneticist
- Jonathan Florencio (born 1976), American musician
- Jonathan Keith Flores (born 1972), Filipino lawyer and politician
- Jonathan P. Folsom (1820–1893), American politician
- Jonathan Folts (born 1968), American Episcopalian bishop
- Jonathan M. Foltz (1810–1877), United States military surgeon
- Jonathan Foo (born 1990), Guyanese cricketer
- Jonathan L. Foote (1935–2026), American architect
- Jonathan Forbes (born 1976), Irish actor
- Jonathan Ford (born 1998), American football player
- Jonathan Foreman (born 1965), British journalist
- Jonathan Forsgren (born 1973), Swedish speedway rider
- Jonathan Forte (born 1986), Barbadian footballer
- Jonathan Fortune (born 1980), English footballer
- Jonathan Forward (1680–1760), English merchant and convict smuggler
- Jonathan Fox, Israeli professor
- Jonathan Fox (born 1991), British Paralympic swimmer
- Jonathan Franco (born 2003), Guatemalan footballer
- Jonathan Frakes (born 1952), American actor and director
- Jonathan Frankel (1935–2008), British historian and writer
- Jonathan Franklin (born 1964), American journalist
- Johnathan Franklin (born 1989), American football player
- Jonathan Franks (born 1990), English footballer
- Jonathan Franks, American advocate and consultant
- Jonathan Frantz, Canadian cinematographer
- Jonathan Franzen (born 1959), American writer
- Jonathan Charles Frederick, Hereditary Chief of the Miskito Nation
- Jonathan Freedland (born 1967), British journalist
- Jonathan Freedman (born 1950), American journalist, writer and social activist
- Jonathan Freeman (born 1950), American actor and puppeteer
- Jonathan Freeman, Canadian cinematographer
- Jonathan Freeman (1745–1808), American politician
- Jonathan Freeman (born 1994), Australian rules footballer
- Jonathan Freeman-Attwood, British academic
- Jonathan Freeny (born 1989), American football player
- Jonathan Freudman (born 1990), Venezuelan actor
- Jonathan Fumeaux (born 1988), Swiss cyclist

== G ==
- Jonathan Gagnoud (born 1988), French-Swiss footballer
- Jonathan Galassi (born 1949), American poet
- Jonathan Gallivan (born 1972), Canadian musician
- Jonathan Galloway (born 1996), Guamanian basketball player
- Jonathan Galván (born 1992), Argentine footballer
- Jonathan Gaming (born 2002), Indian professional esports player
- Jonathan Gannon (born 1983), American football coach
- Jonathan Garb (born 1967), Israeli scholar of Kabbalah
- Jonathan Garcia (born 1986), American speed skater
- Jonathan Garfinkel (born 1973), Jewish-Canadian playwright and author
- Jonathan Garibay (born 1999), American football player
- Jonathan Garrido (born 1973), Spanish cyclist
- Jonathan Garth (born 2000), Irish cricketer
- Jonathan Garth (born 1965), Irish cricketer
- Jonathan Garth, Ireland international rugby league footballer
- Jonathan Garvin (born 1999), American football player
- Jonathan Gathorne-Hardy (1933–2019), British author
- Jonathan Gavin (1966–2013), Scottish judoka
- Jonathan Gay (born 1967), American computer programmer
- Jonathan Geer, American video game composer
- Jonathan Gems (born 1952), British playwright and screenwriter
- Jonathan Genest-Jourdain (born 1979), Canadian politician
- Jonathan Gershenzon (born 1955), American biochemist
- Jonathan Gershuny (born 1949), British sociologist
- Jonathan Gibbs (born 1961), Church of England bishop
- Jonathan Gibbs, British composer
- Jonathan Gibralter (born 1956), Academic administrator
- Jonathan Gibson (born 1987), American basketball player
- Jonathan C. Gibson, Sr. (1793–1849), American farmer, lawyer, politician and soldier
- Jonathan C. Gibson (born 1833), American politician and soldier
- Jonathan Gilad (born 1981), French pianist
- Jonathan Gilbert (born 1967), American television and film actor
- Jonathan Giles (born 1988), Australian rules footballer
- Jonathan Gili (1943–2004), British filmmaker, editor and director
- Jonathan Glancey, British architectural critic and writer
- Jonathan Glanfield (born 1979), British sailor
- Jonathan Glassner, American television director, producer and writer
- Jonathan Glatzer (born 1969), American writer, director, and producer
- Jonathan Glazer (born 1965), English filmmaker
- Jonathan Gledhill (1949–2021), English Anglican clergyman
- Jonathan Glenn (born 1987), Trinidadian footballer
- Jonathan Glickman (born 1969), American film producer
- Jonathan Glover (born 1941), British philosopher
- Jonathan Nash Glynn (born 1951), American abstract artist and businessman
- Jonathan Goble, American Baptist minister and missionary
- Jonathan Goddard (1617–1675), English physician
- Jonathan Goerlach (born 1982), Australian triathlete
- Jonathan Goff (born 1985), American football player
- Jonathan Goforth (1859–1936), Canadian Presbyterian missionary
- Jonathan Gold (1960–2018), American food critic
- Jonathan Goldberg (1943–2022), American literary theorist
- Jonathan Goldman, American author, musician and spiritual teacher
- Jonathan Goldsmith (born 1938), American character actor
- Jonathan Goldsmith, Canadian musician and composer
- Jonathan Goldstein, several people
- Jonathan Gomes (born 1999), American soccer player
- Jonathan Gómez, several people
- Jonathan Gonçalves (born 1989), French footballer
- Jonathan González, several people
- Jonathan Goodall (born 1961), Roman Catholic priest
- Jonathan Goodson (born 1945), American television producer
- Jonathan Goodwin (born 1980), Welsh escapologist
- Jonathan Goodwin (born 1972), British banker and investor
- Jonathan Goodwin (born 1978), American football player
- Jonathan Gostelowe (1744/45–1795), American cabinetmaker
- Jonathan Gøth-Rasmussen (born 1998), Danish professional golfer
- Jonathan Gottschall (born 1972), American literary scholar
- Jonathan Goudeau, American politician
- Jonathan Gough (born 1962), British Anglican priest
- Jonathan Gould (born 1968), English footballer
- Jonathan Gould (born 1961), British television presenter
- Jonathan Gould, American lawyer and comptroller of the currency
- Jonathan Goulet (born 1979), Canadian mixed martial arts fighter
- Jonathan Govett (born 1969), English cricketer
- Jonathan Goya (born 1989), Argentine professional footballer
- Jonathan Gradit (born 1992), French footballer
- Jonathan Grahn (born 2004), Swedish athlete
- Jonathan Grangier (born 1987), French footballer
- Jonathan Granoff, American lawyer, screenwriter and lecturer
- Jonathan Granström (born 1986), Swedish ice hockey player
- Jonathan Grant (born 1993), Guyanese footballer
- Jonathan Gray (born 1980), French-American film producer
- Jonathan Gray (born 1960), English cricketer
- Jonathan Grayer (born 1964), American businessman
- Jonathan Greatorex (born 1970), British music educator
- Jonathan Green, several people
- Jonathan Greenard (born 1997), American football player
- Jonathan Greenblatt (born 1970), American entrepreneur and executive
- Jonathan Greener (born 1961), British Anglican priest
- Jonathan Greenert (born 1953), U.S. Navy admiral
- Jonathan Greenfield (born 1982), South African footballer
- Jonathan Greening (born 1979), English footballer and coach
- Jonathan Greenstein (born 1967), American antiques dealer
- Jonny Greenwood (born 1971), English musician
- Jonathan Gresham (born 1988), American professional wrestler
- Jonathan Grier, American computer scientist
- Jonathan Griffin (born 1906), British military theorist, poet, and translator
- Jonathan Griffiths (born 1964), British-Welsh dual-code international rugby footballer
- Jonathan Griffiths (1773–1839), English-Australian convict, shipowner, and builder
- Jonathan Grigg, British professor
- Jonathan Grimes (born 1989), American football player
- Jonathan Groff (born 1985), American actor and singer
- Jonathan Grossman (born 1967), English professor
- Jonathan Groth (born 1992), Danish table tennis player
- Jonathan Grounds (born 1988), English footballer
- Jonathan Grout (1737–1807), American politician
- Jonathan Grout Jr. (1761–1825), American inventor first optical telegraph
- Jonathan Gruber (born 1965), American economist
- Jonathan Gruber, American director
- Jonathan Gruden (born 2000), American ice hockey player
- Jonathan Grudin (born 1949), American computer scientist
- Jonathan Guerazar (born 1990), Argentine footballer
- Jonathan Guerriero (born 1991), Australian-Russian ice dancer
- Jonathan Guilmette (born 1978), Canadian short track speed skater
- Jonathan Guinness (1930–2026), British peer and businessman
- Jonathan Gullis (born 1990), British politician
- Jonathan Gustafson (born 1997), American luger
- Jonathan Guzmán (born 1989), Dominican boxer

== H ==
- Jonathan Haagensen, Brazilian actor, model, and singer
- Jonathan Haas, American timpanist
- Jonathan Hadary (born 1948), American actor
- Jonathan Hadra (born 1982), American baseball coach
- Jonathan Haeber (born 1981), American historian
- Jonathan Hafetz, American lawyer and writer
- Jonathan Hager, Founder of Hagerstown, Maryland, US
- Jonathan Haggerty (born 1997), British Muay Thai fighter
- Jonathan Haidt (born 1963), American social psychologist and author
- Jonathan Hale (1891–1966), Canadian-born film and television actor
- Jonathan Hales (born 1937), British writer
- Jonathan Halevy (born 1948), Israeli public healthcare expert
- Jonathan Hall, several people
- Jon Hamm (born 1971), American actor
- Jonathan Hammond, American filmmaker
- Jonathan Hammond (born 1980), Scottish sport shooter
- Jonathan Hammond (1891–1980), English footballer
- Jonathan Hampton (1712 – 1777), American colonial surveyor, merchant and officer
- Jonathan Hancock, British world memory champion
- Jonathan Haraden (1744–1803), Massachusetts State Navy officer and privateer
- Jonathan Haralson (1830–1912), American judge
- Jonathan Harboe (born 2000), Danish footballer
- Jonathan Harden, Irish actor and director
- Jonathan Harding, Archdeacon of Dromore from 1895 to 1905
- Jonathan Hardy (1940–2012), New Zealand actor
- Jonathan Harlen, New Zealand author and musician
- Jonathan Harmsworth (born 1967), British peer and owner of the Daily Mail
- Jonathan Harounoff, British Journalist
- Jonathan Harr (born 1948), American writer
- Jonathan Harrington (c. 1811–1881), American ventriloquist and illusionist
- Jonathan Harris (1914–2002), American character actor
- Jonathan Harris (born 1995), American football player
- Jonathan Harris (born 1979), American artist and computer scientist
- Jonathan Harris (born 1955), Australian Paralympic sailor
- Jonathan Harris (born 1964), American politician
- Jonathan Harris, British barrister and legal scholar
- Jonathan Calt Harris (born 1969), American Christian Zionist, writer, and a foreign policy analyst
- Jonathan Gil Harris (born 1963), New Zealand-Indian scholar
- Jonathan Baxter Harrison (1835–1907), Unitarian minister, journalist, early social scientist
- Jonathan Haskel (born 1963), British economist, and academic
- Jonathan Haskell (1755–1814), American military officer
- Jonathan Haslam (born 1951), American historian and Sovietologist
- Jonathan Hassler, American NASCAR crew chief
- Jonathan Hatami (born 1969), American lawyer
- Jonathan Hausman (born 1957), American Conservative rabbi
- Jonathan Hawkins (1983–2025), British chess grandmaster
- Jonathan Hay (born 1975), American publicist, record producer, influencer, and entrepreneur
- Jonathan Hay (born 1979), Australian rules footballer
- Jonathan Hay (born 1992), British runner
- Jonathan Hayes (born 1962), American football player and coach
- Jonathan Hazard (c. 1744 – after 1824), American statesman and politician
- Jonathan Haze (1929–2024), American actor
- Jonathan Hazen (born 1990), Canadian ice hockey player
- Jonathan Head, English broadcast journalist
- Jonathan Healy (born 1997), American taekwondo practitioner
- Jonathan Healy (born 1945), American politician
- Jonathan Nash Hearder (1809–1876), British electrical engineer
- Jonathan Heasley (born 1997), American baseball player
- Jonathan Heawood, English journalist and literary editor
- Jonathan Hedström (born 1977), Swedish ice hockey player
- Jonathan Heeney, Canadian virologist and immunologist
- Jonathan Hefney (born 1985), American gridiron football player
- Jonathan Morgan Heit (born 2000), American actor
- Jonathan Hellström (born 1988), Swedish footballer
- Jonathan Hellyer, British singer
- Jonathan Hendrickx (born 1993), Belgian footballer
- Jonathan Henick, American diplomat
- Jonathan Henke (born 1974), American political blogger
- Jonathan Henry, American politician
- Jonathan Henry (1971–2007), British police officer who was murdered
- Jonathan Hensleigh (born 1959), American screenwriter and film director
- Jonathan Hickman, American comic book writer and artist
- Jonathan Higgs (born 1985), English singer
- Jonathan Hilbert (born 1995), German racewalker
- Jonathan Hill, several people
- Jonathan Himebauch (born 1975), American football player and coach
- Jonathan Hinder (born 1991), British politician
- Jonathan Hirschfeld (born 1979), Israeli painter, curator, columnist and educator
- Jonathan Hirschi (born 1986), Swiss racing and rally driver
- Jonathan Hirtle, American businessman
- Jonathan Hoar (ca 1720–after 1770), Canadian politician
- Jonathan Hobin (born 1979), Canadian photo-based artist
- Jonathan Hodge (1941–2019), British composer
- Jonathan Hodgkin (born 1949), British biochemist
- Jonathan Hoefler (born 1970), American type designer
- Jonathan Hoenig (born 1975), American businessman
- Jonathan Hoffman (born 1972), American investment banker and bond trader
- Jonathan Hogan (born 1951), American actor
- Jonathan Hogg (born 1988), English footballer
- Jonathan Holborow (born 1943), British newspaper editor
- Jonathan Holden (1941–2024), American poet
- Jonathan Holder (born 1993), American baseball player
- Jonathan Holloway (born 1967), American historian
- Jonathan Holloway (born 1955), English theatre director and playwright
- Jonathan Holloway (born 1970), British artistic director
- Jonathan Holmes, (born circa 1948), British-born Australian television journalist and producerJonathan Holmes (born 1975), British theatre director and writer
- Jonathan Holmes (born 1992), American basketball player
- Jonathan Hood (born 1985), Canadian football player
- Jonathan B. Hopkins, American professor
- Jonathan Hornblower (1753–1815), English scientist
- Jonathan Hornblower (1717–1780), English pioneer of steam power
- Jonathan Horne (born 1989), German karateka
- Jonathan Horowitz (born 1966), American artist
- Jonathan Horton (born 1985), American artistic gymnast
- Jonathan House (born 1950), American military historian and author
- Jonathan How, Canadian-American astrophysicist and aeronautical engineer
- Jonathan Howard (born 1984), English actor
- Jonathan Howard (born 1971), English footballer
- Jonathan Howe (born 1935), United States Navy admiral
- Jonathan Howes (1937–2015), American politician
- Jonny Howson (born 1988), English footballer
- Jonathan Huaberdeau (born 1993), Canadian ice hockey player
- Jonathan H. Hubbard (1768–1849), American politician
- Jonathan Huberdeau (born 1993), Canadian ice hockey player
- Jonathan Hughes (1721–1805), Welsh poet
- Jonathan Hughes, British Modern Orthodox rabbi
- Jonathan Hughes (born 1981), Welsh cricketer
- Jonathan Hui, Hong Kong racing driver
- Jonathan Hulls (baptised 1699–1758), English inventor
- Jonathan Humphreys (born 1969), Wales international rugby union player
- Jonathan Hunt, several people
- Jonathan Huntington (1771–1838), American composer
- Jonathan Hurst (born 1966), American baseball player
- Jonathan Huston, Western Australian politician
- Jonathan Hutchinson (1828–1913), English physician and pathologist
- Jonathan Hutchinson (died 1711), English politician
- Jonathan Hutton (born 1956), British-Zimbabwean ecologist
- Jonathan Huxley (born 1965), British artist
- Jonathan Hyde (born 1948), Australian actor

== I ==
- Jonathan Idema (1956–2012), American mercenary and criminal
- Jonathan Ifunga Ifasso (born 1999), DR Congolese footballer
- Jonathan Igbinovia (born 1980), Nigerian tennis player
- Jonathan Iglesias (born 1988), Uruguayan footballer
- Jonathan Ikoné (born 1998), French footballer
- Jonathan India (born 1996), American baseball player
- Jonathan Ingersoll (1747–1823), American politician
- Jonathan Ingram (born 1961), Australian inventor, businessman, author
- Jonathan Irwin (1941–2023), British-Irish bloodstock agent
- Jonathan Isaac (born 1997), American basketball player
- Jonathan Islas (born 1981), Mexican actor
- Jonathan Israel (born 1946), British historian
- Jonathan Ivanoff (born 1989), Argentine footballer

== J ==
- Jonathan Jackson (born 1982), American actor, musician, and author
- Jonathan Jackson (born 1966), American activist and politician
- Jonathan Jackson (born 1977), American football player
- Jonathan Jackson (born 1982), American football player
- Jonathan Jackson, Kenyan-born real estate developer
- Jonathan P. Jackson (1953–1970), Black Panther Party member who attacked a California courtroom
- Jonathan Jacobson (born 1953), American politician
- Jonathan Jacobson, American politician
- Jonathan Jacoby (born 1953), American activist
- Jonathan Jäger (born 1978), French footballer
- Jonathan Jakubwicz (born 1978), Venezuelan filmmaker
- Jonathan James (1983–2008), American ethical hacker
- Jonathan Janil (born 1987), French ice hockey player
- Jonathan Jansen (born 1956), South African academic leader
- Jonathan Janson (born 1950), American painter and art historian
- Jonathan Janson (1930–2015), British sailor
- Jonathan Janssenn (born 1995), New Zealand basketball player
- Jonathan Janz (born 1973), American writer
- Jonathan Jarry, Canadian scientist
- Jonathan Jarvis (born 1953), U.S. National Park Service director
- Jonathan Jáuregui (born 1986), Mexican footballer
- Jonathan Jeanne (born 1997), French basketball player
- Jonathan Jennings (1784–1834), American politician
- Jonathan Asp Jensen (born 2005), Danish footballer
- Jonathan Jeremiah, British singer-songwriter
- Jonathan Jesus (born 2004), Brazilian footballer
- Jonathan Jimenez (born 1997), American soccer player
- Jonathan Jiménez (born 2001), Mexican footballer
- Jonathan Jiménez (born 1992), Salvadoran footballer
- Jonathan Joannides (born 1958), British rally driver
- Jonathan Johansson (born 1980), Swedish musician and singer-songwriter
- Jonathan Johansson (born 1991), Swedish ice hockey player
- Jonathan John (born 2001), Nigerian footballer
- Jonathan Johnson, several people
- Jonathan Jones, several people
- Jonathan Jordan (born 1968), American politician
- Jonathan Joseph (born 1991), English rugby union player
- Jonathan Joseph-Augustin (born 1981), French footballer
- Jonathan Josephs (born 1983), British journalist
- Jonathan Joss (1965–2025), American actor
- Jonathan Joubert (born 1979), French footballer
- Jonathan Joughin, Manx politician
- Jonathan Joy (1826–1889), English cricketer
- Jonathan Judaken, South African-American intellectual historian
- Jonathan Judge, American director and television producer
- Jonathan Judge-Russo (born 1983), American actor and producer
- Jonathan Jules, British actor
- Jonathan Justin (born 1991), Mauritian-French footballer

== K ==
- Jonathan C. Kagan, American immunologist and academic
- Jonathan Kahn, American lawyer and author
- Jonathan Kaiman, American journalist
- Jonathan Kale (born 1985), American-Ivorian basketball player
- Jonathan Kane (born 1956), American musician and composer
- Jonathan Kanter (born 1973), American lawyer
- Jonathan Kaplan (1947–2025), American film director
- Jonathan Kaplan (born 1956), South African medical doctor and writer
- Jonathan Kaplan (born 1966), South African rugby player
- Jonathan Kaplansky, Canadian translator
- Jonathan Kariara (1935–1993), Kenyan poet
- Jonathan Karl (born 1968), American journalist
- Jonathan Karlen (born 1999), American politician
- Jonathan Karp (born 1964), American dramatist
- Jonathan Karsh (born 1971), American film director
- Jonathan Kasdan (born 1979), American writer, director and actor
- Jonathan Kashanian (born 1981), Israeli–Italian television personality and actor
- Jonathan Katz (born 1946), American actor and comedian
- Jonathan Katz, American computer scientist
- Jonathan David Katz (born 1958), American activist, art historian, educator and writer
- Jonathan M. Katz (born 1980), American journalist and author
- Jonathan Ned Katz (born 1938), American author of human sexuality
- Jonathan Kaufer (1955–2013), American film director
- Jonathan Kauffman (born 1971), American journalist
- Jonathan Kaufman (born 1956), American journalist
- Jonathan Kay (born 1968), Canadian journalist
- Jonathan Kaye (born 1970), American professional golfer
- Jonathan Kaye (born 1942), American linguist
- Jonathan Kearney (born 1971), English artist
- Jonathan Kearsley (1786–1859), American military officer and politician
- Jonathan Keates (born 1946), English writer
- Jonathan Keating (born 1963), British mathematician
- Jonathan D. Keaton (born 1946), American bishop
- Jonathan Keeperman, American far-right activist
- Jonathan Kellerman (born 1949), American novelist
- Jonathan Kelly (1947–2020), Irish folk rock singer-songwriter
- Jonathan Kelly (born 1969), English oboist
- Jonathan Keltz (born 1988), American actor
- Jonathan Kemp (born 1967), English writer
- Jonathan Kemp (born 1981), English squash player
- Jonathan Kennard (born 1985), British racing driver
- Jonathan Kent (born 1973), English cricketer
- Jonathan Kent (born 1946), English theater director
- Jonathan Kenworthy (born 1943), English sculptor
- Jonathan Kerner (born 1974), American baseball player
- Jonathan Kerrigan (born 1972), English actor
- Jonathan Kesselman (born 1974), American screenwriter
- Jonathan Kestenbaum (born 1959), British businessperson, academic and peer
- Jonathan Kievman (born 1961), American racing driver
- Jonathan Kim (born 2001), American football player
- Jonathan Kim (born 1960), South Korean film producer
- Jonathan Kimberley (1651–1720), English Dean of Lichfield
- Jonathan Kimmel (born 1976), American writer, producer, and director
- Jonathan King (born 1944), English musician and producer
- Jonathan King (born 1967), New Zealand film director
- Jonathan King (born 1942), Australian historian
- Jonathan King (born 1993), South African soccer player
- Jonathan Kingdon (born 1935), Tanzanian-British artist and naturalist
- Jonathan Kingham, American musician
- Jonathan Kings, New Zealand diplomat
- Jonathan Kosgei Kipkorir (born 1982), Kenyan long-distance runner
- Jonathan Kirkpatrick (born 1958), New Zealand Anglican bishop
- Jonathan Kirsch, American novelist
- Jonathan Kite (born 1979), American actor
- Jonathan Kitilit (born 1994), Kenyan runner
- Jonathan Klein (born 1960), American businessman
- Jonathan Klein (born 1987), American racing driver
- Jonathan Philip Klein (1956-2016), American dog training expert
- Jonathan Klick (born 1975), American economist
- Jonathan Klinsmann (born 1997), German football player
- Jonathan C. Knight (born 1964), British physicist
- Jonathan B. Knudsen (1944–1999), American historian
- Jonathan A. Kobes (born 1974), American judge
- Jonathan Kodjia (born 1989), French-Ivorian footballer
- Jonathan F. Koffa (born 1963), Liberian politician
- Jonathan Kolb, American baseball executive
- Jonathan Koloi (born 1974), Tongan former international rugby union player
- Jonathan Komagum (born 1998), French basketball player
- Jonathan Kongbo (born 1996), Zaire-born gridiron football player
- Jonathan Koon, Chinese-American fashion designer
- Jonathan Koppell, American academic
- Jonathan Paul Koppenhaver (born 1981), American mixed martial artist known as War Machine
- Jonathan Kos-Read (born 1973), American actor
- Jonathan Kozol (born 1936), American activist
- Jonathan Kraft (born 1964), American businessman
- Jonathan Kramer (1942-2004), American classical composer
- Jonathan Krause (born 1992), American football player and coach
- Jonathan Kreinik, American record producer
- Jonathan Kreisberg, American jazz guitarist
- Jonathan Kreiss-Tomkins (born 1989), American politician
- Jonathan Krisel (born 1979), American screenwriter
- Jonathan Krohn (born 1995), American author
- Jonathan Kruk, American storyteller
- Jonathan Kuck (born 1990), American speed skater
- Jonathan Kuminga (born 2002), Congolese basketball player
- Jonathan Kumuteo (born 1995), Congolese-British boxer
- Jonathan Kushner (1962–1973), American child rape and murder victim
- Jonathan Kydd (born 1956), British actor and narrator
- Jonathan Kydd (born 1951), British academic
- Jonathan Kyle (born 1982), American politician

== L ==
- Jonathan Lacerda (born 1987), Uruguayan footballer
- Jonathan Lachlan-Stewart, Canadian actor
- Jonathan Lacoste (born 1993), American internet entrepreneur
- Jonathan Lacôte (born 1972), French diplomat
- Jonathan Lacourt (born 1986), French footballer
- Jonathan Laidlaw (born 1960), English barrister
- Jonathan Lake, Scottish judge
- Jonathan Lalrinchhana (born 1986), Indian cricketer
- Jonathan Lambert (born 1973), French actor and comedian
- Jonathan Lambert (1772–1812), American sailor
- Jonathan Landman (born 1952), American journalist
- Jonathan Homer Lane (1819–1880), American astrophysicist and inventor
- Jonathan Langa (born 1990), Canadian gridiron football player
- Jonathan Langdon (born 1987), Canadian actor
- Jonathan Landgrebe (born 1977), German publisher
- Jonathan LaPaglia (born 1969), Australian actor and television personality
- Jonathan Lapointe (born 1984), Canadian football player
- Jonathan LaPook (born 1953), American physician
- Jonathan Lardot (born 1984), Belgium football referee
- Jonathan Larkin (born 1984), American politician
- Jonathan Larsen (born 1940), American journalist and philanthropist
- Jonathan Larson (1960–1996), American composer, lyricist and playwright
- Jonathan Lash (born 1945), American lawyer and academic
- Jonathan Lasker (born 1948), American abstract painter
- Jonathan V. Last (born 1974), American journalist and author
- Jonathan Lastra (born 1993), Spanish bicycle racer
- Jonathan Latimer (1906–1983), American novelist
- Jonathan Laugel (born 1993), French rugby player
- Jonathan Laurens (born 1977), Venezuelan footballer
- Jonathan Lavine (born 1966), American business
- Jonathan Law (1674–1750), American lawyer, judge, and politician
- Jonathan Lawrence (1737–1812), American merchant and politician
- Jonathan Leaf, American playwright and author
- Jonathan Lean (born 1952), Welsh priest
- Jonathan Leape, American economist
- Jonathan Lear (1948–2025), American philosopher and psychoanalyst
- Jonathan Learoyd (born 2000), French ski jumper
- Jonathan Leathers (born 1985), American soccer player
- Jonathan Leavitt (1764–1830), American politician
- Jonathan Leavitt (1731–1802), American minister
- Jonathan Leavitt (1797–1852), American publisher
- Jonathan Lebed (born 1984), American businessman
- Jonathan Ledbetter (born 1997), American football player
- Jonathan Lee (born 1958), Taiwanese singer and producer
- Jonathan Lee (born 1981), British writer
- Jonathan Legard (born 1961), British journalist
- Jonathan Legear (born 1987), Belgian footballer and coach
- Jonathan Legris (born 1987), British racing driver
- Jonathan Lekkerimäki (born 2004), Swedish ice hockey player
- Jonathan Leko (born 1999), British footballer
- Jonathan Lemalu (born 1976), New Zealand singer
- Jonathan Leman (born 1997), Swedish ice hockey player
- Jonathan Lemire (born 1979), American journalist
- Jonathan Lemkin, American screenwriter
- Jonathan Lemon (born 1965), American cartoonist
- Jonathan Leo, American anatomy professor
- Jonathan Leong (born 1962), Singaporean music artist
- Jonathan Leria (born 1990), French basketball player
- Jonathan Lerman (born 1987), American painter
- Jonathan Leshnoff (born 1973), American composer
- Jonathan Leslie (born 1950), Tanzanian-English squash player
- Jonathan Lethem (born 1964), American novelist, essayist, and short story writer
- Jonathan Letterman (1824–1872), United States Army officer and surgeon
- Jonathan Leunbach (1884–1955), Danish doctor and sexual education advocate
- Jonathan Levav (born 1975), Israeli-American professor
- Jonathan Levi (born 1955), American writer and producer
- Jonathan Levi (born 1996), Swedish footballer
- Jonathan Levin (born 1972), American economist
- Jonathan Levin (born 1993), Mexican footballer
- Jonathan LeVine (born 1968), American art dealer
- Jonathan Levine (born 1976), American film director and screenwriter
- Jonathan Levit (born 1971), American magician
- Jonathan Levitt (born 1963), English chess grandmaster
- Jonathan Lewellen, American economist
- Jonathan Lewis, several people
- Jon Lewis (born 1975), English cricketer and coach
- Jonathan Liebsman (born 1976), South African director
- Jonathan Ligali (born 1991), French footballer
- Jonathan Lin (born 1977), Taiwanese politician
- Jonathan Lind (born 2003), Danish footballer
- Jonathan Lindsay (born 1992), Scottish footballer
- Jonathan Lindley (1756–1828), American legislator
- Jonathan Lindseth (born 1996), Norwegian footballer
- Jonathan Lindsey, American politician
- Jonathan Lipnicki (born 1990), American child actor
- Jonathan Lippman (born 1945), American judge
- Jonathan Lisecki (born 1976), American producer and actor
- Jonathan Lisle (1974–2025), British DJ
- Jonathan Littell (born 1967), American-French writer
- Jonathan Little (born 1984), American poker player
- Jonathan Little (born 1965), Australian composer
- Jonathan Littman (born 1958), American technology journalist and author
- Jonathan Littman (born 1962/63), American film producer
- Jonathan Lloyd (1948–2025), British composer
- Jonathan Lloyd (born 1956), British-Canadian social worker and Anglican priest
- Jonathan Lo, American artist
- Jonathan Loáisiga (born 1994), Nicaraguan baseball player
- Jonathan Lobert (born 1985), French sailor
- Jonathan Lockwood (born 1981), Canadian baseball player
- Jonathan Lomas (born 1968), English golfer
- Jonathan Lomas (born 1952), British-Canadian health researcher
- Jonathan London (born 1947), American children’s author
- Jonathan London (born 1978), American film director
- Jonathan Longley (born 1969), American-British cricketer
- Jonathan Lopes (born 1969), American artist
- Jonathan Lopez, several people
- Jonathan Lord (born 1962), British politician
- Jonathan Losos (born 1961), American evolutionary biologist
- Jonathan Loughran (born 1966), American actor
- Jonathan Bell Lovelace (1895–1979), American businessman
- Jonathan Lovitz (born 1984), American political figure
- Jonathan Low (born c. 1990s), New Zealand online personality
- Jonathan Lowe (born 1977), English cricketer
- Jonathan Lu (born 1969), Chinese businessman
- Jonathan Lubin (born 1936), American mathematician
- Jonathan Lucroy (born 1986), American baseball player
- Jonathan Luigs (born 1986), American football player
- Jonathan Lujan (born 1971), American Paralympic alpine skier
- Jonathan Luna (1965–2003), American lawyer and unsolved murder victim
- Jonathan Lundberg (born 1996), Swedish footballer
- Jonathan Lunine (born 1959), American planetary scientist
- Jonathan Lunney (born 1998), Irish footballer
- Jonathan Lyle (born 1959), British engineer and senior civil servant
- Jonathan Lynam, Westmeath Gaelic footballer
- Jonathan Lyne (born 1990), Irish Gaelic footballer
- Jonathan Lynn (born 1943), British director, writer, and actor

== M ==
- Jonathan Maberry (born 1958), American author
- Jonathan Mack (born 1984), German human rights activist, educator and scholar
- Jonathan Mackey (born 1977), South African cricketer
- Jonathan Mackie, American politician
- Jonathan Magbie (1977–2004), American quadriplegic
- Jonathan Magee (born 1972), Northern Irish footballer and academic
- Jonathan Magonet (born 1942), British rabbi theologian
- Jonathan Mahler (born 1969), American journalist
- Jonathan Maicelo (born 1983), Peruvian professional boxer
- Jonathan Maier (born 1992), German basketball player
- Jonathan Maitland, British playwright
- Jonathan Kiplimo Maiyo (born 1988), Kenyan long distance runner
- Jonathan Majors (born 1989), American actor
- Jonathan Makepeace (1774–1850), American politician
- Jonathan Malaya (born 1973), Filipino writer and public official
- Jonathan Malen, Canadian actor
- Jonathan Malo (born 1983), Canadian baseball player
- Jonathan Malu (born 1993), Congolese-German basketball player
- Jonathan Manalo (born 1978), Filipino composer and music producer
- Jonathan Mance (born 1943), British judge
- Jonathan Mane-Wheoki (1943–2014), New Zealand art historian, curator, and academic
- Jonathan Mangum (born 1971), American comedian
- Jonathan Mann (1947–1998), American WHO administrator
- Jonathan Mann (born 1982), American singer-songwriter
- Jonathan Mann (born 1960), Canadian journalist
- Jonathan Mannion, American photographer and film director
- Jonathan Manns, British-New Zealand urbanist and property professional
- Jonathan Marc (born 1988), French slalom canoeist
- Jonathan Marcantoni, American novelist
- Jonathan Marchessault (born 1990), Canadian ice hockey player
- Jonathan Marc (born 1973), Bayesian statistician and professor
- Jonathan Marín (born 1982), Colombian cyclist
- Jonathan Markovitch (born 1967), Chief Rabbi of Kyiv
- Jonathan Marks (born 1952), British politician and life peer
- Jonathan M. Marks (born 1955), American biological anthropologist
- Jonathan Marland (born 1956), British businessman
- Jonathan Marray (born 1981), English tennis player
- Jonathan Marsden (born 1960), British art historian, curator and courtier
- Jonathan Marsden (born 1993), English cricketer
- Jonathan Marshall (1924–2008), American editor
- Jonathan Marshall (born 1997), American football defensive tackle
- Jonathan Martin (1782–1838), English arsonist
- Jonathan Martín (born 1981), Spanish footballer
- Jonathan Martin (born 1989), American football player
- Jonathan Martin (born 1977), American journalist
- Jonathan Martin (born 1981), American politician
- Jonathan Martinez (born 1994), American mixed martial artist
- Jonathan Gyet Maude (born 1938), Paramount ruler of Ham (Jaba) Chiefdom
- Jonathan Mauri (born 1984), Costa Rican swimmer
- Jonathan Maxcy (1768–1820), American minister and college president
- Jonathan May (1958–2010), American cellist and conductor
- Jonathan Mayer (born 1987), American computer scientist and lawyer
- Jonathan Mayers (1974–2025), American music promoter
- Jonathan Mayezo (born 2000), French kickboxer
- Jonathan Mayhew (1720–1766), American Congregational minister
- Jonathan Maza (born 1998), Argentine footballer
- Jonathan McCarty (1795–1852), American politician
- Jonathan McCollum, American professor, ethnomusicologist, and performer
- Jonathan McCully (1809–1877), Canadian Father of Confederation
- Jonathan McDaniel (born 1985), American actor
- Jonathan McDonald (born 1987), Costa Rican footballer
- Jonathan McDowell (born 1960), British astronomer
- Jonathan McEvoy (born 1989), British cyclist
- Jonathan McGovern, English historian and author
- Jonathan McGovern, English baritone singer
- Jonathan McIntosh, American content creator
- Jonathan McKain (born 1982), Scottish-Australian footballer
- Jonathan McKee (born 1959), American sailor
- Jonathan McKernan, American government official
- Jonathan McKinsey, American games engineer
- Jonathan McMillan (born 1978), American politician
- Jonathan McNiven (born 1978), American politician
- Jonathan McReynolds (born 1989), American gospel musician
- Jonathan Mead (born 1964), Royal Australian Navy admiral
- Jonathan Meades (born 1947), British writer
- Jonathan Meades (born 1992), Welsh footballer
- Jonathan Campbell Meakins (1882–1959), Canadian physician and medical author
- Jonathan Meath (born 1955), American TV producer
- Jonathan Medved (born 1955), American-Israeli businessman and investor
- Jonathan Meeks (born 1989), American football player
- Jonathan Meese (born 1970), German painter
- Jonathan Meiburg (born 1976), American musician and writer
- Jonathan Meier (born 1999), German footballer
- Jonathan Meléndez (1988—2026), Mexican keyboardist and composer
- Jonathan Mellor (born 1986), British long distance runner
- Jonathan Melvoin (1961–1996), American musician
- Jonathan Mendes (born 1989), French footballer
- Jonathan Mendes (born 1990), Brazilian hurdler
- Jonathan Mendelsohn (born 1980), American singer
- Jonathan Mendoza (born 1990), Colombian footballer
- Jonathan Menéndez (born 1994), Argentine footballer
- Jonathan Menkos (born 1975), Guatemalan economist and politician
- Jonathan Mensah (born 1990), Ghanaian footballer
- Jonathan Mercier (born 1986), Swedish ice hockey player
- Jonathan Meredith (about 1772–1805), American marine
- Jonathan Meredith (born 1978), Samoan international rugby union player
- Jonathan Mergui (born 2000), Israeli singer, actor and dancer
- Jonathan Merlo (born 1998), Australian cricketer
- Jonathan Messer (born 1976), Australian film director
- Jonathan Messinger, American writer, critic and editor
- Jonathan Mestel (born 1957), British chess grandmaster and mathematician
- Jonathan Metcalf, American politician
- Jonathan Metzl (born 1964), American psychiatrist and author
- Jonathan Meunier (born 1987), Canadian mixed martial arts fighter
- Jonathan Mexique (born 1995), footballer
- Jonathan Meyer (born 1965), American lawyer and government official
- Jonathan Meyrick (born 1952), British Anglican retired bishop
- Jonathan Meza (born 1983), American voice actor
- Jonathan Michaeles (born c. 1969), American football coach
- Jonathan Michie (born 1957), British economist
- Jonathan Midol (born 1988), French freestyle skier
- Jonathan Milan (born 2000), Italian cyclist
- Jonathan Mildenhall (born 1967), British businessman
- Jonathan Miles, several people
- Jonathan Miller, several people
- Jonathan Mills (born 1984), Welsh rugby player
- Jonathan Mills (born 1963), Australian composer and festival director
- Jonathan Milner (born 1981), English footballer
- Jonathan Mingo (born 2001), American football player
- Jonathan Miramontes (born 1988), Mexican footballer
- Jonathan Mirsky (1932–2021), American journalist
- Jonathan Mitchell (born 1994), British footballer
- Jonathan Mitchell (born 1955), American writer and blogger
- Jonathan Moakes, South African politician
- Jonathan Moffett (born 1954), American drummer
- Jonathan Moffett (born 1937), Irish rugby union player
- Jonathan Mogbo (born 2001), American basketball player
- Jonathan Mokuena (born 1981), South African rugby union player
- Jonathan Monaghan (born 1986), American animator and artist
- Jonathan Moncada (born 1998), Nicaraguan footballer
- Jonathan Monje (born 1981), Chilean long-distance runner
- Jonathan Monk (born 1969), English artist
- Jonathan Monro (born 1974), Canadian-American actor and singer
- Jonathan Monsalve (born 1981), Venezuelan road cyclist
- Jonathan Montenegro (born 1978), Venezuelan actor and singer
- Jonathan Montenegro (born 1990), Ecuadorian footballer
- Jonathan Montgomery, British legal scholar
- Jonathan Moore, several people
- Jonathan Morali (born 1980), French musician
- Jonathan Morduch (born 1963), American economist
- Jonathan Moreira (born 1996), Argentine professional footballer
- Jonathan Moreira (born 1986), Brazilian professional footballer
- Jonathan D. Moreno (born 1952), American philosopher and historian
- Jonathan Morgan (born 1974), British politician
- Jonathan Morgan, English football coach and former player
- Jonathan Moriamé (born 1984), French water polo player
- Jonathan Morley (1884–1957), English footballer
- Jonathan Morrell, British journalist and presenter
- Jonathan Morris, British writer
- Jonathan Morris (born 1972), American journalist
- Jonathan Morsay (born 1997), Sierra Leonean footballer
- Jonathan Morton, American politician
- Jonathan Moscone (born 1964), American theater director
- Jonathan O. Moseley (1762–1838), American politician
- Jon Moss (born 1970), English football referee
- Jonathan Moss (born 1975), Australian cricketer
- Jonathan Moss (born c. 1969), American rower and assist referee
- Jonathan Mostow (born 1961), American film director, screenwriter and producer
- Jonathan Moulton (1726–1787), American military general
- Jonathan Mover, American drummer
- Jonathan Moxey (born 1995), American gridiron football player
- Jonathan Moya (born 1992), Costa Rican footballer
- Jonathan Moyle (died 1990), British journalist
- Jonathan Moyo (born 1957), Zimbabwean politician
- Jonathan Muecke (born 1983), American architect and designer
- Jonathan Muiomo (born 1999), Mozambican footballer
- Jonathan Mulder (born 2002), Israeli footballer
- Jonathan Mulia (born 1986), Indonesian actor
- Jonathan Mullin (born 1978), Irish journalist, footballer, and coach
- Jonathan Mumford (1842–1892), New Zealand cricketer
- Jonathan Muñoz (born 1995), Mexican weightlifter
- Jonathan Munro (born 1966), British journalist
- Jonathan Murphy (born 1981), American actor
- Jonathan Murray (born 1955), American television producer
- Jonathan Musgrave, British orienteering competitor
- Jonathan Mutombo (born 2002), French footballer
- Jonathan Muzinga (born 2002), Finnish footballer
- Jonathan Myerson (born 1960), British writer
- Jonathan Myles (born 1982), American luger
- Jonathan Myles-Lea (1969–2021), English painter

== N ==
- Jonathan Nahimana (born 1999), Burundian footballer
- Jonathan Nanizayamo (born 1992), French footballer
- Jonathan Narh Ayertey, Ghanaian entomologist and academic
- Jonathan O. Ndagi (1929–2026), Nigerian academic and author
- Jonathan Ndiku (born 1991), Kenyan long-distance runner
- Jonathan Neale (born 1962), British engineer and business executive
- Jonathan Nelson (born 1974), American gospel singer and songwriter
- Jonathan Nelson (born 1988), American football player
- Jonathan Nesci (born 1981), American designer
- Jonathan Netanyahu (born 1946), Israeli military officer
- Jonathan Newdick (born 1948), English artist
- Jonathan Newell (born 1978), English cricketer
- Jonathan Newhouse (born 1952), American publisher
- Jonathan Newman (born 1972), British filmmaker and writer
- Jonathan Newman, American businessman, lawyer, and regulator
- Jonathan Uhry Newman (1927–1991), American attorney and judge
- Jonathan Newsome (born 1991), American football player
- Jonathan Newth (born 1939), English actor
- Jonathan Nez (born 1975), Navajo and American politician
- Jonathan Kimetet arap Ng'eno (c.1937 -1998), Kenyan politician
- Jonathan Nichols (1965–2019), American politician
- Jonathan Nichols (born 1981), American college football player
- Jonathan Nichols (1681–1727), Rhode Island governor
- Jonathan Nichols Jr. (1712–1756), American politician
- Jonathan Nitzan, Israeli-Canadian economist
- Jonathan Niva (1942–2001), Kenyan footballer
- Jonathan Nolan (born 1976), British-American screenwriter
- Jonathan Norbye (born 2007), Norwegian footballer
- Jonathan Norcross (1808-1898), American politician
- Jonathan Nordbotten (born 1989), Norwegian alpine skier
- Jonathan Northcroft, Scottish journalist
- Jonathan Norton (born 1958), American musician
- Jonathan Nossiter (born 1961), American filmmaker
- Jonathan Nott (born 1962), British conductor
- Jonathan Novak, American art dealer
- Jonathan Novoa (born 1981), Chilean footballer and manager
- Jonathan Noyce (born 1971), British musician
- Jonathan Núñez (born 1986), Chilean footballer
- Jonathan Núñez (born 2001), Honduran footballer
- Jonathan Nurse (born 1885), Guyanese cricketer

== O ==
- Jonathan Obika (born 1990), English footballer
- Jonathan October (born 1974), South African-Finnish cricketer
- Jonathan Odell (1737–1818), American poet
- Jonathan Ogden (born 1974), American football player
- Jonathan Robert Ogden (1806–1882), English composer
- Jonathan Ogden (died 1803), Canadian surgeon
- Jonathan Okita (born 1996), Congolese footballer
- Jonathan Okoronkwo (born 2003), Nigerian footballer
- Jonathan Oldfield (born 1994), English comedian
- Jonathan Onyemelukwe (1930–2011), Nigerian Anglican bishop
- Jonathan Oppenheim (born 1970), British scientist
- Jonathan Oppenheim (1952–2020), American film editor
- Jonathan Oppenheimer (born 1969), South African businessman
- Jonathan Orellana (born 1979), Chilean football manager and player
- Jonathan Ornelas (born 2000), American baseball player
- Jonathan Orozco (born 1986), Mexican footballer
- Jonathan Orr (born 1983), American football player
- Jonathan Orszag (born 1973), American economist
- Jonathan Osan (born 1996), Argentine footballer
- Jonathan Osborne (??–1864), Irish physician
- Jonathan Osorio (born 1992), Canadian professional soccer player
- Jonathan Kamakawiwoʻole Osorio (born 1949-1950), Native Hawaiian professor of Hawaiian studies
- Jonathan Otley (1766-1856), British watchmaker and geologist
- Jonathan Ott (1949–2025), American ethnobotanist and writer
- Jonathan Overend, English radio journalist
- Jonathan Overpeck (born 1957), American climate scientist
- Jonathan Owen (born 1973), British contemporary artist
- Jonathan Owens (born 1995), American football player and husband of Simone Biles
- Jonathan Robert Owiredu (born 1931), Ghanaian politician
- Jonathan Oxer (born 1970), Australian software developer

== P ==
- Jonathan Page (born 1990), English footballer
- Jonathan Pageau (born 1975), French-Canadian icon carver, YouTuber and public speaker
- Jonathan Paget (born 1983), New Zealand equestrian
- Jonathan Paiement (born 1985), Canadian ice hockey player
- Jonathan Painchaud (born 1974), Canadian singer-songwriter
- Jonathan Palata, British boxer
- Jonathan Palma (born 1981), Venezuelan sprinter
- Jonathan Palmer (born 1956), British racing driver and motorsport executive
- Jonathan Palmer (born 1983), American football player
- Jonathan Panzo (born 2000), English footballer
- Jonathan Papelbon (born 1980), American baseball pitcher
- Jonathan Papik (born 1982), American judge
- Jonathan Paredes (1989–2025), Colombian cyclist
- Jonathan Paredes (born 1989), Mexican high diver
- Jonathan Parker (born 1937), British Lord Justice of Appeal
- Jonathan Parker, American politician
- Jonathan Parker (born 1976), English chess grandmaster
- Jonathan Parpeix (born 1990), French footballer
- Jonathan Parr (born 1988), Norwegian footballer
- Jonathan Parry (born 1957), British historian
- Jonathan Parson (born 1942), New Zealand cricketer and businessman
- Jonathan Parsons (1705–1776), Christian New England clergyman
- Jonathan Parsons, British artist
- Jonathan Partington (born 1955), English mathematician
- Jonathan Paton (born 1971), American politician
- Jonathan Patten (1744–1809), American merchant and politician
- Jonathan Patz, American academic
- Jonathan Paul (1853–1931), German Pentecostal minister
- Jonathan Paz (born 1995), Honduran footballer
- Jonathan Pearce (born 1959), English football commentator
- Jonathan Pearce (born 1992), American mixed martial artist
- Jonathan Pearce (born 1957), English cricketer
- Jonathan Pearson (1813–1887), American author
- Jonathan Pease (born 1952), British racehorse trainer
- Jonathan Pedneault (born 1990), Canadian politician
- Jonathan Peel (1799–1879), British Army general
- Jonathan Peled, Israeli diplomat
- Jonathan Pélissié (born 1988), France international rugby union player
- Jonathan Pelto, American politician
- Jonathan Peña (born 1973), Puerto Rican fencer
- Jonathan Pendlebury (born 1983), English rugby union player
- Jonathan Penner (born 1962), American actor
- Jonathan Penner (born 1940), American writer
- Jonathan Penrose (1933–2021), English chess grandmaster
- Jonathan Pentreath (born 1966), Royal Navy Rear Admiral
- Jonathan Pereira (1804–1853), British pharmacologist and author
- Jonathan Pereira (born 1987), Spanish footballer
- Jonathan Pérez (born 2003), Mexican footballer
- Jonathan Pérez (born 1987), French footballer
- Jonathan Pérez, Chilean drummer
- Jonathan Perkins (born 1976), English cricketer
- Jonathan Perlaza (born 1997), Ecuadorian footballer
- Jonathan Permal (born 1994), Mauritian sprinter
- Jonathan Perry (born 1976), New Zealand footballer
- Jonathan Perry (born 1965), English cricketer
- Jonathan Perry (born 1973), American politician
- Jonathan Persson (born 1994), German badminton player
- Jonathan Perzley (born 1984), American sports agent
- Jonathan Phang, British food writer and chef
- Jonathan Phelps (1928–2011), American radio announcer
- Jonathan Phillippe (born 1988), Argentine footballer
- Jonathan Phillips (born 1982), Welsh ice hockey player
- Jonathan Phillips (born 1952), British civil servant
- Jonathan Piel (born 1938), American science journalist and editorJonathan
- Jonathan Pienaar (1962–2025), South African actor
- Jonathan Pierce (1967–2020), American singer and interior designer
- Jonathan Pike (born 1949), English painter
- Jonathan Pila (born 1962), Australian mathematician
- Jonathan Pillow, American neuroscientist
- Jonathan Pim (1806–1885), Irish politician
- Jonathan Pim (1858–1949), Irish lawyer, judge and politician
- Jonathan Piña (born 1989), Mexican footballer
- Jonathan Pinson, American politician
- Jonathan Pintaro (born 1997), American baseball player
- Jonathan Píriz (born 1986), Uruguayan footballer
- Jonathan Pitkin (born 1978), Irish-Scottish composer
- Jonathan Pitney (1797–1869), American physician
- Jonathan Pitre (2000–2018), Canadian with a rare genetic mutation
- Jonathan Pitroipa (born 1986), Burkinabè footballer
- Jonathan Pittis (born 1982), Canadian-Italian ice hockey player
- Jonathan Pittman (born 1963), American judge
- Jonathan Plaut (1942–2012), American writer and rabbi
- Jonathan Plowman Jr. (1717–1795), American revolutionary
- Jonathan Plowright (born 1959), English classical pianist
- Jonathan Podwil (born 1966), American painter
- Jonathan Poff (born 1987), New Zealand rugby player
- Jonathan Pollak (born c. 1982), Israeli graphic designer
- Jonathan Pollard (born 1954), American intelligence analyst and convicted spy
- Jonathan Poneman (born 1959), American music executive
- Jonathan Pool (born 1942), Americana political scientist
- Jonathan Portes (born 1966), American economist
- Jonathan Potter (born 1956), British psychologist
- Jonathan Poulin, Canadian politician
- Jonathan Powell, several people
- Jonathan Pratt, American diplomat
- Jonathan Prescott (1725–1807), British military officer
- Jonathan Price, American composer
- Jonathan Prideaux (c.1646–1710), English politician
- Jonathan Prideaux (died 1637), English politician
- Jonathan Priestman (1786–1863), English Quaker businessman
- Jonathan Prince (born 1958), American actor
- Jonathan Printzlau (born 1976), Danish tennis player
- Jonathan K. Pritchard, British geneticist
- Jonathan Proietti (born 1982), Luxembourgish footballer
- Jonathan Pruitt, American behavioral ecologist
- Jonathan Pryce (born 1947), Welsh actor
- Jonathan Pudas (born 1993), Swedish ice hockey player
- Jonathan Pugh (born 1962), English cartoonist
- Jonathan Punwet, Nigerian politician

== Q ==
- Jonathan Quarcoo (born 1996), Norwegian sprinter
- Jonathan Quarmby (born 1961), English record producer
- Jonathan Quick (born 1986), American ice hockey player
- Jonathan Quijada (born 1995), Venezuelan volleyball player
- Jonathan Quinn (born 1975), American football player and coach

== R ==
- Jonathan Raban (1942–2023), British travel writer, critic, and novelist
- Jonathan Rabb (born 1964), American novelist
- Jonathan Racine (born 1993), Canadian ice hockey player
- Jonathan Rado, American musician, record producer and engineer
- Jonathan Raggett (born 1992), British film actor
- Jonathan Raine (1763–1831), English barrister, judge and politician
- Jonathan M. Raines, American psychoanalyst
- Jonathan Ramírez (born 1990), Uruguayan footballer
- Jonathan Ramis (born 1989), Uruguayan footballer
- Jonathan Randal, American journalist
- Jonathan Randolph (born 1988), American professional golfer
- Jonathan Rapping, American criminal defense attorney
- Jonathan Rasheed (born 1991), Norwegian footballer
- Jonathan Rashleigh, several people
- Jonathan Rauch (born 1960), American journalist
- Jonathan Raymond (born 1971), American writer
- Jonathan Rea (born 1987), Northern Irish motorcycle racer
- Jonathan Reaume (born 1989), Canadian racing driver and team owner
- Jonathan Rebolledo (born 1991), Chilean footballer
- Jonathan Redmond, Irish film editor
- Jonathan Rée (born 1948), British historian and philosopher
- Jonathan Rees, British private investigator
- Jonathan Rees (1841–1905), Welsh poet, educationalist, and colliery official
- Jonathan Reguero (born 1989), Spanish footballer
- Jonathan Reid (born 1972), American boxer
- Jonathan Reid (born 1982), Barbadian politician
- Jonathan Reis (born 1989), Brazilian footballer
- Jonathan Reisman (born 1981), American physician
- Jonathan Remmington (1677–1745), Massachusetts colonial judge
- Jonathan Rendell (1964–2013), British writer
- Jonathan Rennert (born 1952), British musician
- Jonathan Renouf, Jersey politician and television producer
- Jonathan Requena (born 1996), Argentine footballer
- Jonathan Reyes, Filipino basketball coach
- Jonathan Reynolds (born 1980), British politician
- Jonathan Reynolds (1942–2021), American writer
- Jonathan Rhoads (1907–2002), American surgeon
- Jonty Rhodes (born 1969), South African cricketer
- Jonathan Rhys Meyers (born 1977), Irish actor
- Jonathan Richard (born 1991), Aruban footballer
- Jonathan Richards (born 1954), British sailor
- Jonathan Richards, American novelist
- Jonathan Richards, American politician
- Jonathan Richardson (born 1804), Irish politician
- Jonathan Richardson (1667–1745), English painter
- Jonathan Lee Riches (born 1976), American fraudster
- Jonathan Richman (born 1951), American singer-songwriter and guitarist
- Jonathan Richmond (1774–1853), American politician
- Jonathan Richter (born 1985), Danish footballer
- Jonathan Ricketts (born 1997), American soccer player
- Jonathan Rieckmann (born 1987), Brazilian racewalker
- Jonathan Rigby, English actor and film historian
- Jonathan Rigg, British tea planter and lexicographe
- Jonathan Riley (born 1955), American philosopher
- Jonathan Riley-Smith (1938–2016), British historian
- Jonathan Ring (born 1991), Swedish footballer
- Jonathan Ringayen (born 1988), French footballer
- Jonathan Ripley (born 20th century), English director, producer, and writer
- Jonathan Risueño (born 1982), Spanish footballer
- Jonathan Rivas (born 1992), French footballer
- Jonathan Rivera (born 1986), American politician
- Jonathan Rivierez (born 1989), French footballer
- Jonathan Roberts (born 1974), American professional ballroom dancer
- Jonathan Roberts (born 1956), American screenwriter
- Jonathan Roberts (1771–1854), American politician
- Jonathan Robertson (born 1991), Dutch footballer
- Jonathan Robinson, several people
- Jonathan Roche, South African rugby union player
- Jonathan Rodden (born 1971), American political scientist
- Jonathan Rodriguez, several people
- Jonathan Rogers (1920–1964), Welsh-Australian sailor and recipient of the George Cross
- Jonathan Romain (born 1954), British rabbi
- Jonathan Rommelmann (born 1994), German rower
- Jonathan Root, English portrait photographer
- Jonathan Rosa, American linguistic anthropologist
- Jonathan Rosand, American neurologist
- Jonathan Rosario (born 1984), Dominican footballer
- Jonathan Rose (born 1993), American gridiron football player
- Jonathan Rosen, American author
- Jonathan Rosenbaum (born 1943), American film critic
- Jonathan Rosenbaum (born 1947), American scholar, college administrator, and rabbi
- Jonathan Rosenberg, several people
- Jonathan Rosenblatt (born 1956), American Modern Orthodox rabbi, teacher, lecturer and counselor
- Jonathan Rosenblum (born 1951), American rabbi
- Jonathan Rosenhead (born 1938), British mathematician, operational researcher and activist
- Jonathan Ross (born 1960), English broadcaster
- Jonathan Ross (1826–1905), American politician and judge
- Jonathan Todd Ross (born 1978), American voice actor and writer
- Jonathan Rossini (born 1989), Swiss footballer
- Jonathan Rotenberg (born 1963), American executive coach, management consultant, and author
- Jonathan Rothberg (born 1963), American scientist and entrepreneur
- Jonathan Rothschild (born 1955), American lawyer and politician
- Jonathan Rougier (born 1987), Argentine footballer
- Jonathan Roumie (born 1974), American actor
- Jonathan Rousselle (born 1990), French basketball player
- Jonathan Routh (1927–2008), English painter and comedian
- Jonathan Rowan (born 1981), English footballer
- Jonathan Rowe (born 2003), English footballer
- Jonathan Rowe (born 1998), Canadian politician
- Jonathan Rowland (born 1975), British businessman
- Jonathan Rowson (born 1977), Scottish chess grandmaster
- Jonathan Roxmouth (born 1987), South African musical theater actor and singer
- Jonathan Roy (born 1989), Canadian pop singer and songwriter
- Jonathan Ruffer (born 1951), British investor and philanthropist
- Jonathan Ruffin (born 1981), American gridiron football player
- Jonathan Ruffle, British writer, director and producer
- Jonathan Ruhumuliza (born 1956), Rwandan Anglican bishop
- Jonathan Ruiz (born 1982), Spanish footballer
- Jonathan Ruiz (born 1995), Aruban footballer
- Jonathan Ruque (born 2000), French association footballer
- Jonathan Ruru (born 1993), New Zealand rugby player
- Jonathan Rush (born 1989), American football player
- Jonathan Russell, several people
- Jonathan Rutherford (born 1956), British academic
- Jonathan Ruttens (born 1987), Belgian footballer
- Jonathan Ruvalcaba (born 1991), Dominican Republic diver
- Jonathan Ryan, Irish actor

== S ==
- Jonathan Sabbatini (born 1988), Uruguayan footballer
- Jonathan Sacerdoti (born 1980), British journalist and broadcaster
- Jonathan Sachs (born 1947), American software engineer
- Jonathan Sackner-Bernstein (born 1961), American physician
- Jonathan Sacks, Baron Sacks (1948–2020), British Orthodox rabbi and politician
- Jonathan Sacoor (born 1999), Belgian sprinter
- Jonathan Sadowski (born 1979), American actor
- Jonathan Safran Foer (born 1977), American novelist
- Jonathan Sagall (born 1959), Israeli actor and director
- Jonathan Saidel, American politician
- Jonathan Salvador (born 1991), Chilean footballer
- Jonathan Samet (born 1946), American physician and epidemiologist
- Jonathan Samuel (1853–1917), British manufacturer and politician
- Jonathan Samuels (born 1972), British broadcast journalist
- Jonathan Sánchez (born 1982), Puerto Rican baseball player
- Jonathan Sánchez (born 1994), Mexican footballer
- Jonathan Sandoval (born 1987), Uruguayan footballer
- Jonathan Sangaya (1907–1979), Malawian church leader
- Jonathan Sanger (born 1944), American film and television producer
- Jonathan Santana (born 1981), Argentine-Paraguayan footballer
- Jonathan Santiago (born 1994), French footballer
- Jonathan Santucci (born 2002), American baseball player
- Jonathan Sarfati (born 1964), New Zealand young earth creationist and chess player
- Jonathan Sarna (born 1955), American historian
- Jonathan Satter (born 1969), American businessman and political appointee
- Jonathan Saunders (born 1977), Scottish fashion designer
- Jonathan Savi de Tové (1895–1971), Togolese politician
- Jonathan Savoie, Canadian photographer
- Jonathan Kiplimo Sawe (born 1995), Kenyan middle-distance runner
- Jonathan Sayeed (born 1948), British politician
- Jonathan Sayer (born 1988), English playwright and comedian
- Jonathan Scales (born 1984), American steel pannist and composer
- Jonathan Scarfe, Canadian actor
- Jonathan Scarth (1772–1850), British industrialist
- Jonathan Schaeffer (born 1957), Canadian researcher and professor
- Jonathan Schaffer, American philosopher
- Jonathan Schanzer, American author, executive director
- Jonathan Schauer (born 2005), German diver
- Jonathan Schell (1943–2014), American author and advocate
- Jonathan Scherzer (born 1995), Austrian footballer
- Jonathan Schleuss, American journalist
- Jonathan D. Schiller (born 1946), American lawyer
- Jonathan Schooler (born 1959), American professor
- Jonathan Schoop (born 1991), Curaçaoan baseball player
- Jonathan Schork, American artist, writer, and filmmaker
- Jonathan Schunke (born 1987), Argentine footballer
- Jonathan Schwartz (born 1938), American radio disc jockey
- Jonathan Schwartz (born 1969/70), American film producer, screenwriter
- Jonathan I. Schwartz (born 1965), American businessman
- Jonathan Scott, several people
- Jonathan Seaver (1855–???), Irish-Australian politician, engineer and surveyor
- Jonathan Segal (1953–1999), American television actor
- Jonathan Segal, American film director
- Jonathan Segel (born 1963), American composer and multi-instrumentalist
- Jonathan Seidman, American geneticist
- Jonathan Sela (born 1978), French-Israeli cinematographer
- Jonathan Self (born 1959), British journalist
- Jonathan Senchyne, American academic
- Jonathan Sénécal (born 1999), Canadian gridiron football player
- Jonathan Seremes (born 2000), French triple jumper
- Jonathan Dickinson Sergeant (1746–1793), American politician
- Jonathan Sesma (born 1978), Spanish footballer
- Jonathan Sessler (born 1956), American chemist
- Jonathan Sewall (1729–1796), American Colonial attorney general
- Jonathan Sewell (1766–1839), Lower Canada lawyer, politician, and judge
- Johnny Sexton (born 1985), Irish rugby union player
- Jonathan Shafer (born 2005), American racing driver
- Jonathan Shainin, British journalist
- Jonathan Shalit (born 1962), British talent manager
- Jonathan Shapiro, American lawyer and writer
- Jonathan Sharp, English musician and sound designer
- Jonathan Shaughnessy, Canadian curator
- Jonathan Shaw, several people
- Jonathan Shay (born 1941), American clinical psychiatrist
- Jonathan Shecter (born 1968), American magazine editor and music promoter
- Jonathan Shell (born 1987), American politician
- Jonathan Shepard (born 1948), British historian
- Jonathan Shepherd, Welsh surgeon
- Jonathan Sherbino, Canadian physician and author
- Jonathan Sherr (born 1974),
- Jonathan Sherratt (born 1967), British mathematician
- Jonathan Shestack (born 1959), American film producer
- Jonathan Shewchuk, Canadian computer scientist
- Jonathan Sickler, American politician
- Jonathan Siegrist (born 1985), American rock climber
- Jonathan Sigalet (born 1986), Canadian ice hockey player
- Jonathan Silk (born 1960), American academic
- Jonathan Silva (born 1994), Argentine footballer
- Jonathan Henrique Silva (born 1991), Brazilian triple jumper
- Jonathan Silver (1949–1997), English entrepreneur
- Jonathan Silver (1937–1992), American sculptor
- Jonathan Silverman (born 1966), American actor
- J. K. Simmons (born 1955), American actor
- Jonathan Simms (1984-2011), Northern Irish medical patient
- Jonathan Simms (born 2007), American sprinter
- Jonathan Simon (born 1958/59), American legal scholar
- Jonathan Simons, American oncologist
- Jonathan Simpkin (born 1987), Australian rules footballer
- Jonathan Sims, British author, voice actor, musician, and games designer
- Jonathan Sinclair (born 1970), British diplomat
- Jonathan Singer (born 1979), American politician
- Jonathan Singer (born 1984), Canadian blogger
- Jonathan Singleton (born 1978), American singer-songwriter
- Jonathan Sirois (born 2001), Canadian soccer player
- Jonathan Sisson (1690–1747), English instrument maker and inventor
- Jonathan Siyachitema (1932–2022), Zimbabwean Anglican bishop
- Jonathan Skinner, British author, journalist and Baptist minister
- Jonathan Skinner, American economist
- Jonathan Skjöldebrand (born 1983), Swedish-Israeli basketball player
- Jonathan Skrmetti (born 1977), American lawyer and politician
- Jonathan Slaff (born 1950), American theater publicist
- Jonathan Slaght, American writer and conservation biologist
- Jonathan Slater (born 1961), British civil servant
- Jonathan Slavin (born 1969), American actor
- Jonathan Slinger, British actor
- Jonathan Sloane (1785–1854), American politician
- Jonathan Smallwood (1975–2025), British psychologist and academic
- Jonathan Smeeton, British lighting and production designer
- Jonathan Smedley (1671–1729), Anglo-Irish churchman and schoool administrator
- Jonathan Smith, several people
- Jon Snow (born 1947), English journalist and television presenter
- Jonathan Sobol, Canadian film director and screenwriter
- Jonathan Soeharno (born 1977), Dutch lawyer, professor, and senator
- Jonathan Sogbie (born 1970), Liberian footballer
- Jonathan Sole (born 1987), New Zealand cricketer
- Jonathan Solís (born 1993), Guatemalan badminton player
- Jonathan Solomon (born 1967), Australian rules footballer
- Jonathan Solomons (born 1976), South African soccer player
- Jonathan Somers (1862–1928), Australian Machinery manufacturer
- Jonathan Sorensen (born 1965), American university professor
- Jonathan Soriano (born 1985), Spanish professional footballer
- Jonathan Soros (born 1970), American businessman
- Jonathan Sothcott (born 1980), British film producer
- Jonathan Souza (born 1989), Uruguayan footballer
- Jonathan Sowah (born 1985), Ghanaian footballer
- Jonathan Speak (born 1965), Northern Irish footballer and manager
- Jonathan Spector (born 1986), American former soccer player
- Jonathan Spector, American playwright
- Jonathan D. Spence (1936–2021), English-American historian
- Jonathan Spencer (born 1954), British social anthropologist and academic
- Jonathan Spencer-Jones (born 1963), British rower
- Jonathan Sperber (born 1952), American professor and historian
- Jonathan Sriranganathan, Australian politician and activist
- Jonathan Stack (born 1957), American filmmaker
- Jonathan Stafford (born 1980 or 1981), American ballet dancer and artistic director
- Jonathan Staley (1868–1917), English footballer
- Jonathan Stalling (born 1975), American poet and academic
- Jonathan Stamler (born 1959), English-American physician and biochemist
- Jonathan Stanbury (born 1951), British fencer
- Jonathan Stanton (1834–1918), American ornithologist
- Jonathan Stark (born 1971), American professional tennis player
- Jonathan Stark (born 1955), American actor and screenwriter
- Jonathan Stark (born 1995), American basketball player
- Jonathan Starr, American businessperson
- Jonathan Stedall (1938–2022), English television producer and documentary filmmaker
- Jonathan Steele (born 1941), British journalist
- Jonathan Steinberg (1934–2021), American historian
- Jonathan Steinberg, American politician
- Jonathan Steingard (born 1983), Canadian musician
- Jonathan Stenbäcken (born 1988), Swedish handball player
- Jonathan Stenner (born 1966), English cricketer and gastroenterologist
- Jonathan Stephens (born 1960), British civil servant
- Jonathan Stephenson (1950–2011), North Irish politician
- Jonathan Sterling (born 1982), American basketball player and referee
- Jonathan Stern, American film producer
- Jonathan Stern (born 1965), British sports shooter
- Jonathan Sternberg (1919–2018), American conductor, musical director and professor emeritus
- Jonathan Sterne, British statistician and NIHR Senior Investigator
- Jonathan Steuer (born 1965), American publisher
- Jonathan Stewart (born 1987), American football player
- Jonathan Stewart (born 1990), American football player
- Jonathan Stickland (born 1983), American politician
- Jonathan Stiever (born 1997), American baseball player
- Jonathan Stinson, American singer and composer of opera
- Jonathan Stock (born 1983), German journalist and staff writer
- Jonathan Stockhammer (born 1969), American conductor
- Jonathan Stoddard (1807–1855), American attorney
- Jonathan Stokes (c.1755–1831), English physician and botanist
- Jonathan W. Stokes, American film producer
- Jonathan Stokke (born 1984), American tennis player
- Jonathan Stoklosa (born 1981 or 1982), American powerlifter
- Jonathan Stone, American politician
- Jonathan Stone (1823–1897), American politician
- Jonathan P. Stoye (born 1952), English virologist
- Jonathan Strahan (born 1964), Northern Irish-Australian editor and publisher
- Jonathan Stranks (born 1994), British acrobatic gymnast
- Jonathan Strasser (1947–2017), American musician, educator, teacher, and conductor
- Jonathan Strauss, American music entrepreneur
- Jonathan Street (1943–2012), British novelist
- Jonathan Strong (c. 1747/8–1773), West Indian slave
- Jonathan Strong (born 1944), American author
- Jonathan Stroud (born 1970), British author
- Jonathan Stuart (born 1975), Scottish rugby union player
- Jonathan Stubbs (born 1972), American army officer
- Jonathan Stupar (born 1984), American football player
- Jonathan Sturges (1802–1874), American businessman and arts patron
- Jonathan Sturges (1740–1819), American politician
- Jonathan Sua (born 2004), Australian rugby league footballer
- Jonathan Suárez (born 1997), American soccer player
- Jonathan Suárez (born 1982), Venezuelan cyclist
- Jonathan Sullivan, British political scientist and Sinologist
- Jonathan Summers (born 1946), Australian operatic baritone
- Jonathan Summerton (born 1988), American race car driver
- Jonathan Sumption (born 1948), British author, historian, barrister and former senior judge
- Jonathan Sutherland (born 1977), Scottish television presenter
- Jonathan Sutherland (born 1998), Canadian gridiron football player
- Jonathan Svedberg (born 1999), Swedish association football player
- Jonathan Svensson (born 2000), Swedish politician
- Jonathan Swan (born 1985), Australian-American journalist
- Jonathan Sweet (born 1946), Australian actor
- Jonathan Sweet (born 1973), Australian freestyle skier
- Jonathan Swift (1667–1745), Anglo-Irish author
- Jonathan Swift, British army officer
- Jonathan Swift (bor 1964), British judge
- Jonathan Sykes, American engineer
- Jonathan Sykes (born 1990), Bahamian footballer

== T ==
- Jonathan Tabu (born 1985), Belgian basketball player
- Jonathan Nii Tackie Kommey, Ghanaian teacher, public servant and a politician
- Jonathan Taconing (born 1987), Filipino boxer
- Jonathan Tah (born 1996), German footballer
- Jonathan Talbot (born 1939), American painter
- Jonathan Tamayo (born 1984), American poker player
- Jonathan Tamimi (born 1994), Jordanian footballer
- Jonathan Tammuz, British-Canadian film director
- Jonathan Tan (born 1995), Singaporean footballer
- Jonathan Tan (born 1976), Filipino politician and businessman
- Jonathan Tan (born 2002), Singaporean swimmer
- Jonathan Taplin (born 1947), American film producer
- Jonathan Tarbell (1820–1888), American judge
- Jonathan Tasini (born 1956), American journalist
- Jonathan Taumateine (born 1996), Samoa international rugby union player
- Jonathan Tavernari (born 1987), Brazilian-Italian professional basketball player
- Jonathan Taylor, several people
- Jonathan Techera (born 1989), Uruguayan footballer
- Jonathan Tehau (born 1988), Tahitian footballer
- Jonathan Téhoué (born 1984), French footballer
- Jonathan Tel, British fiction writer, poet and critic
- Jonathan Temm (1962–2021), New Zealand barrister
- Jonathan Tennenbaum (born 1979),
- Jonathan Tenney (1817–1888), American librarian and educator
- Jonathan Tennyson (1945–1997), American car designer
- Jonathan Tennyson (born 1955), British physicist
- Jonathan Teplitzky, Australian writer and film director
- Jonathan Tepperman, American journalist, writer and editor
- Jonathan Terry, American actor
- Jonathan Tetelman (born 1988), Chilean-American operatic tenor
- Jonathan Thiré (born 1986), French cyclist
- Jonathan Thirkield, American poet
- Jonathan Thomas (born 1982), Wales international rugby union footballer
- Jonathan Taylor Thomas (born 1981), American actor and director
- Jonathan Thompson (1782–1823), American lawyer and land speculator
- Jonathan Thompson (1773–1846), American merchant, banker and politician
- Jonathan Thorn (1779–1811), US Navy officer
- Jonathan Thursz (1895–1976), Polish-born Jewish community leader
- Jonathan Tiernan-Locke (born 1984), English racing cyclist
- Jonathan Tiersten (1965–2026), American actor
- Jonathan Tiffoney (born 1991), Scottish footballer
- Jonathan Tinhan (born 1989), French footballer
- Jonathan Tiomkin (born 1979), American fencer
- Jonathan Tisch (born 1953), American businessman
- Jonathan Tisdall (born 1958), Irish-Norwegian chess grandmaster and journalist
- Jonathan Titcomb (1819–1887), English clergyman
- Jonathan S. Tobin, American journalist
- Jonathan Tod (1939–2025), British Royal Navy officer
- Jonathan Toews (born 1988), Canadian ice hockey player
- Jonathan Togo (born 1977), American actor
- Jonathan Tokplé (born 1986), French-Togolese footballer
- Jonathan Toledo (born 1996), Uruguayan footballer
- Jonathan Tomines, Canadian chiropodist
- Jonathan Tomkinson (born 2002), American soccer player
- Jonathan Tomlinson (born 1982), Welsh lawn bowler
- Jonathan Tonge, British political scientist
- Jonathan Toogood (1784–1870), English surgeon
- Jonathan Top (born 1993), Guatemalan footballer
- Jonathan Torgovnik (born 1969), Israeli photographer
- Jonathan Tornato (born 1989), French basketball player
- Jonathan Toro (born 1996), Honduran footballer
- Jonathan Torohia (born 1985), Tahitian association football player
- Jonathan Torrens (born 1972), Canadian actor and television personality
- Jonathan Toto (born 1990), French footballer
- Jonathan Toubin (born 1971), American musician
- Jonathan Toup (1713–1785), British philologist
- Jonathan Townsend (born 1942), English cricketer
- Jonathan Tran, Vietnamese-American theologian
- Jonathan Trelawny (1568–1604), English Member of Parliament
- Jonathan Tremblay (born 1984), Canadian politician
- Jonathan Trevethick (1864–1939), New Zealand politician
- Jonathan Tridente (born 1983), Argentine footballer
- Jonathan Trigell, British-French author
- Jonathan Tropper (born 1970), American novelist and television writer
- Jonathan Trott (born 1981), South African-English cricketer
- Jonathan Trotter (c.1797–1865), English-American manufacturer and politician
- Jonathan Trower (born 1979), English cricketer
- Jonathan Trumbull (1710–1785), American politician
- Jonathan Trumbull Jr. (1740–1809), American politician and military officer
- Jonathan Tucker (born 1982), American actor
- Jonathan Tuffey (born 1987), Northern Irish footballer
- Jonathan Tulloch, British author and naturalist
- Jonathan Tumukunde (born 1998), Ugandan volleyball player
- Jonathan Tunick (born 1938), American orchestrator, musical director, and composer,
- Jonathan Turley (born 1961), American attorney and commentator
- Jonathan Turnbull (born 1962), English cricketer
- Jonathan Baldwin Turner (1805–1899), American academic
- Jonathan Tweet (born 1965), American game designer
- Jonathan Tyers (1702–1767), Proprietor of Vauxhall Gardens in London
- Jonathan Tyler (1940–2026), British activist and academic

== U ==
- Jonathan Unger (born 1946), Australian sinologist
- Jonathan T. Updegraff (1822–1882), American medical doctor, abolitionist and politician
- Jonathan Uptin (born 1971), Australian journalist
- Jonathan Urretaviscaya (born 1990), Uruguayan footballer
- Jonathan Utley (born 1942), American history professor
- Jonathan Uyloan (born 1983), Filipino-American basketball player

== V ==
- Jonathan Valin (born 1947), American mystery author
- Jonathan Vallée (born 1995), Canadian soccer player
- Jonathan Valois (born 1971), Canadian politician
- Jonathan van der Schyff (born 1983), South African rugby union player
- Jonathan van der Werff (died 2026), British soldier, judge, and author
- Jonathan Van Every (born 1979), American baseball player
- Jonathan van Lange (born 2006), Guyanese cricketer
- Jonathan Van Ness (born 1987), American hairstylist and TV personality
- Jonathan Van-Tam (born 1964), British healthcare professional
- Jonathan Vance (born 1964), Canadian army general
- Jonathan Vandiar (born 1990), South African cricketer
- Jonathan Vankin, American author
- Jonathan Varane (born 2001), Martiniquais footballer
- Jonathan Varey (born 1961), English cricketer
- Jonathan Vaughan (born 1963), British double-bassist, academic and university administrator
- Jonathan Vaughn (born 1981), British-American organist and choir director
- Jonathan Vaughters (born 1973), American racing cyclist and team manager
- Jonathan Vega (born 1997), Mexican footballer
- Jonathan Veitch (born 1959), American academic
- Jonathan Velasco, Venezuelan diplomat
- Jonathan Vergara Berrio (born 1999), Dutch footballer
- Jonathan Vervenne (born 2003), Belgian cyclist
- Jonathan Vervoot (born 1993), Belgian footballer
- Jonathan Vidallé (born 1977), Chilean-Argentine footballer
- Jonathan Viera (born 1989), Spanish footballer
- Jonathan Vigliotti (born 1983), American journalist
- Jonathan Vila (born 1986), Spanish footballer
- Jonathan Villagra (born 2001), Chilean footballer
- Jonathan Villanueva (born 1988), American soccer player
- Jonathan Villar (born 1991), Dominican baseball player
- Jonathan Vilma (born 1982), American football player and analyst
- Jonathan Vipond (born 1945), American politician
- Jonathan Viscosi (born 1991), Canadian soccer player
- Jonathan Vitale (born 1981), American international rugby union player
- Jon Voigt (born 1938), American actor
- Jonathan Voltzok, US international rugby union player
- Jonathan Vosselman (born 1984), Dutch footballer

== W ==
- Jonathan Wacks, American film director
- Jonathan Wade (born 1984), American football player
- Jonathan Wade, Australian curler
- Jonathan Wade-Drahos, American film and television actor
- Jonathan Wafula (born 1994), Kenyan footballer
- Jonathan Wahl, American mathematician
- Jonathan M. Wainwright (1883–1953), American WWII army general captured by Japanese
- Jonathan Mayhew Wainwright (1792–1854), English bishop
- Jonathan Mayhew Wainwright (1821–1863), United States Navy officer
- Jonathan Walasiak (born 1982), Belgian footballer
- Jonathan Waldman, American journalist
- Jonathan Wale (born 1991), Scottish track cyclist
- Jonathan Walf (born 1982), English cricketer
- Jonathan Walker (1799–1878), American abolitionist
- Jonathan Walker (born 1981), Scotland international rugby league footballer
- Jonathan Hoge Walker (1754–1824), American judge
- Jonathan Wallace (born 1986), American professional basketball player
- Jonathan Wallace, American politician
- Jonathan Walters (born 1983), Irish footballer
- Jonathan Walton (born 1990), British rower
- Jonathan Wang (born 1984), Taiwanese-American film producer
- Jonathan Ward (born 1970), American actor
- Jonathan Ward (born 1997), American football player
- Jonathan Ward, British Paralympic athlete
- Jonathan Ward (1768–1842), American politician
- Jonathan Ware (born 1984), American pianist
- Jonathan Warrey, American politician
- Jonathan Wartiovaara (1875-1937), Finnish civil servant and politician
- Jonathan Waterhouse (born 1965), English cricketer
- Jonathan Waterman (born 1956), American writer and photographer
- Jonathan Wathen (c.1728–1807), English surgeon
- Jonathan Watkins (born 1957), English art historian
- Jonathan Watson, Scottish actor
- Jonathan Watt (born 1937), English cricketer
- Jonathan Watton, Canadian actor
- Jonathan Watts, British journalist
- Jonathan Waxman (born 1950), American chef
- Jonathan Waxman (born 1951), British physician, oncologist and author
- Jonathan Weaver (1824–1901), American bishop
- Jonathan Weaver (born 1977), British ice hockey player
- Jonathan Webb (born 1963), English international rugby union player
- Jonathan Webb (born 1990), English footballer
- Jonathan Webster, American linguist
- Jonathan Wehner, Antiguan politician
- Jonathan Weil (born 1970), American journalist, analyst and attorney
- Jonathan Weinberg (born 1957), American artist and art historian
- Jonathan Weiner (born 1953), American nonfiction writer
- Jonathan P. Weiner, American health services researcher
- Jonathan Weinzapfel (born 1965), American politician
- Jonathan Weisbrod, American Entrepreneur
- Jonathan M. Weiss (born 1942), American scholar
- Jonathan Weissman, American scientist and academic
- Jonathan Wells (1942–2024), American biologist and theologian
- Jonathan Wells (born 1988), Australian cricketer
- Jonathan Wells (born 1979), American football player
- Jonathan Welsh (born 1982), American football player
- Jonathan Welsh (1947–2005), Canadian actor
- Jonathan Wentz (1990–2012), American Paralympic equestrian competitor
- Jonathan Westberg (born 1994), Swedish chess grandmaster
- Jonathan Westmaas (born 1981), Trinidadian footballer
- Jonathan Westphal (born 1951), Academic philosopher
- Jonathan Wheatley (born 1967), British motorsport executive and mechanic
- Jonathan Wiesen, American history professor
- Jonathan Wild (1682/83–1725), English criminal
- Jonathan Wileman (born 1970), English cricketer
- Jonathan Wilhelmsson (born 1991), Swedish director and filmmaker
- Jonathan Wilhite (born 1984), American football player
- Jonathan Wilk, American politician
- Jonathan Wilkenfeld (born 1942), American political scientist and professor
- Jonathan Wilker, American scientist, engineer, and educator
- Jonathan Wilkes (born 1978) English television presenter, entertainer and singer
- Jonathan Phillip Wilkins (born 1971), American musician and record producer
- Jonathan Wilkinson (born 1965), Canadian politician
- Jonathan Wilkinson (1859–1934), English footballer
- Jonathan Wilks (born 1967), British diplomat
- Jonathan Wilson, several people
- Jonathan Wingard, American politician
- Jonathan Winters (1925–2013) American comedian, actor, and artist
- Jonathan Wisniewski (born 1985), French rugby union player
- Jonathan Wittenberg (born 1957), Scottish rabbi
- Jonathan Wolff (born 1959), British political philosopher
- Jonathan Wolff (born 1958), American composer
- Jonathan Wolfe (born 1970), American television producer and artist manager
- Jonathan Wolfson (born 1970), American television producer and artist manager
- Jonathan Wolstenholme (born 1950), British artist and illustrator
- Jonathan Wong (born 1986), Hong Kong singer-songwriter, actor and producer
- Jonathan Wood, British investment manager and former proprietary trader
- Jonathan Woodard (born 1993), American football player
- Jonathan Woodcock (born 1962), Royal Navy Vice Admiral
- Jonathan Woodgate (born 1980), English footballer
- Jonathan Woodhouse (born 1955), British minister
- Jonathan Woodhouse (born 1987), English actor, director and producer
- Jonathan J. Woodman (1825–1907), American politician
- Jonathan Woodner (1944–1988), American rally driver
- Jonathan Woodson, American government official
- Jonathan M. Woodward (born 1973), American actor
- Jonathan Wordsworth (1932–2006), English academic and critic
- Jonathan Worth (1802–1869), American politician
- Jonathan Worth, British photographer
- Jonathan Wrather (born 1969), English actor
- Jonathan Wren (born 1999), Irish rugby union player
- Jonathan Wright, several people
- Jonathan Jasper Wright (1840–1877), American judge
- Jonathan Würtele (1792–1853), Canadian politician
- Jonathan Saxton Campbell Würtele (1828–1904), Canadian politician
- Jonathan Wutawunashe, Zimbabwean musician
- Jonathan Wyatt (born 1972), New Zealand long-distance runner
- Jonathan Wynn (born 1994), American football player
- Jonathan Wysocki (born 1967), American writer, director and producer

== X ==
- Jonathan Xu (born 1982), Singaporean footballer

== Y ==
- Jonathan Yardley (born 1939), American author and book critic
- Jonathan Yasin (born 1967), Malaysian politician
- Jonathan Yates, American conductor
- Jonathan Yavin (born 1972), Israeli writer
- Jonathan Yeo (born 1970), British artist
- Jonathan Yim (born 1984), American basketball coach
- Jonathan Yiombi (born 2000), Democratic Republic of Congo entertainer
- Jonathan Young (1826–1885), United States Navy officer
- Jonathan Young (born 1958), New Zealand politician
- Jonathan Young (born 1944), American psychologist and mythographer
- Jonathan Yudis, American film director
- Jonathan Yudkin (born 1960), American multi-instrumentalist
- Jonathan A. Yuen (born 1961), American admiral

== Z ==
- Jonathan Zebin (born 1978), French footballer
- Jonathan Carl Zenker (1799–1837), German naturalist
- Jonathan Zenneck (1871–1959), German physicist and electrical engineer
- Jonathan Zenon (born 1984), American football player
- Jonathan Zimmerman, American historian of education
- Jonathan Zinman (born c. 1971), American economist
- Jonathan Zipf (born 1986), German triathlete
- Jonathan Zittrain (born 1969), American law professor
- Jonathan Zizmor (born 1945), American dermatologist
- Jonathan Zongo (born 1989), Burkinabé footballer
- Jonathan Zucker (born 1971), American businessman
- Jonathan Zydko (born 1984), French footballer

== Fictional Characters ==
- Jonathan Archer, Fictional character from Star Trek: Enterprise
- Jonathan Byers, fictional character from the television show, Stranger Things
- Jonathan Cheval, fictional character from DC Comics
- Jonathan Cole, fictional character from the television show, NCIS
- Jonathan Gordon-Davies, fictional character from the Channel 4 soap opera, Brookside
- Jonathan Harker, Fictional character created by author Bram Stoker
- Jonathan Higgins, Fictional character on American crime drama television series, Magnum, P.I.
- Jonathan Joestar, Fictional character from Japanese manga series, JoJo's Bizarre Adventure
- Jonathan Kent, Fictional adoptive parent of Superman
- Jonathan Krantz, fictional character from American television series, Prison Break
- Jonathan Kurtiss, fictional character in the Australian drama series, Winners & Losers
- Jonathan Leroy, fictional character from the British television soap opera, EastEnders
- Jonathan Levinson, fictional character from American supernatural television series, Buffy the Vampire Slayer
- Jonathan Oldbuck, fictional character in Sir Walter Scott's 1816 novel, The Antiquary
- Jonathan Paget, fictional character from American television soap opera, General Hospital
- Jonathan Pangborn, fictional character from the Marvel Cinematic Universe
- Jonathan Pie, Fictional English news reporter portrayed by English comedian Tom Walker
- Jonathan Septimus, Fictional character in the Belgian comic Blake and Mortimer series
- Jonathan Turner, fictional character in American television sitcom, Boy Meets World
- Jonathan Verne, fiction character from the Australian television soap opera, Neighbours

== See also ==
- For the Israeli moshav, see Yonatan, Golan Heights
- Johnathan, alternate uncommon spelling name
- Johnathon, alternate uncommon spelling name
- Jonathon, another alternate spelling
- John (given name)
- Nathaniel, for a name with a similar root and meaning
