= Khudaydatov =

Khudaydatov or Hudaydatov (Russian: Худайдатов, Hebrew: חודיידטוב) is a Jewish-Bukharan surname. The last name comes from the Persian name "Khudoydot", which means "God given". The Hebrew equivalent of the name is Yonatan (יהונתן; Jonathan).

== See also ==
- Sarit Hadad (born Sarah Hodadetova), Israeli singer
