= Jonathan Calderwood =

Northern Irish football groundskeeper

Jonathan Calderwood is a Northern Irish football groundskeeper who specialises in turf management of football pitches.

== Career ==
In 2013, Calderwood was appointed groundskeeper of French Ligue 1 club Paris Saint-Germain.

In 2025, the Parc des Princes was voted as the best football pitch in Ligue 1 for the seventh time in nine years under Calderwood's leadership.

== Personal life ==
Calderwood's son Ethan, born in 2007, played in the youth academy of Paris Saint-Germain in the 2015–16 season, alongside Zlatan Ibrahimović's son Vincent. In 2024, Ethan Calderwood was called up to the Northern Ireland under-17s.
