= Jonathan Guerazar =

Argentine footballer

Personal information
- Full name: Jonathan Ezequiel Guerazar
- Date of birth: 26 March 1990 (age 36)
- Place of birth: Buenos Aires, Argentina
- Height: 1.74 m (5 ft 9 in)
- Position: Midfielder

Senior career*
Years	Team	Apps	(Gls)
2007–2012	Unión San Felipe	25	(0)
2012	Unión San Felipe B	23	(8)
2013	Palestino	0	(0)
- * Club domestic league appearances and goals as of 7 April 2020

Jonathan Ezequiel Guerazar (born 26 March 1990) is an Argentine professional footballer who plays as a midfielder.
