= Jonathan Pike =

English painter

Palazzo Correr Contarini, date unknown.

Jonathan Pike (born 1949 in Leatherhead, Surrey) is an English painter.

An architectural painter, primarily a watercolourist, he also paints in oils. He specializes in views of Venice, Cuba, Rome, and Florence as well as London and Dublin.

His painting 'Rooftops' has been in the collection of the City of London Corporation since 1989.

In 2009 Jonathan Pike won first prize in The Royal Watercolour Society/Sunday Times Watercolour competition for his painting Monte Carlo. He received £12,000.
