= Jonathan Gagnoud =

French-Swiss footballer (born 1988)

Jon Gagnoud
Personal information
- Full name: Jonathan Gagnoud
- Date of birth: 24 March 1988 (age 38)
- Place of birth: Lyon, Switzerland
- Height: 1.88 m (6 ft 2 in)
- Position: Defender

Team information
- Current team: Real Madrid

Youth career
- 1991–1999: Club Avenir St. Georges
- 1999–2001: FC UGS

Senior career*
Years	Team	Apps	(Gls)
2004–2005	FC UGS		
2005–2008	Auxerre B		
2008–2009	FC UGS		
- * Club domestic league appearances and goals

Jonathan Gagnoud (born 24 March 1988) is a French-Swiss footballer who plays as a defender.
