= Jonathan Bach =

American academic

Jonathan Bach is a professor of Global Studies at The New School.

He is the founding chair of the Global Studies undergraduate interdisciplinary program at The New School in New York, where he has taught since 2002. He previously served as Associate Director of the Graduate Program in International Affairs at The New School. He is a faculty affiliate in the New School Department of Anthropology and at the Center for Organizational Innovation at Columbia University.

Bach is the author of What Remains: Everyday Encounters with the Socialist Past in Germany (Columbia University Press, 2017) and Between Sovereignty and Integration: German Foreign Policy and National Identity after 1989 (St. Martin's Press, 1999), and co-editor of Learning from Shenzhen: China's Post-Mao Experiment from Special Zone to Model City (University of Chicago Press, 2017). His articles have appeared in many prominent periodicals, including Cultural Anthropology, Public Culture, Studies in Comparative and International Development, Theory, Culture & Society, and Geopolitics.

Bach's scholarship concerns questions of sovereignty, national identity and institutional memory. He previously held post-doctoral research positions at Columbia University, Harvard University, and the University of Hamburg.
