= Jonathan Owen =

- Born: 1973 (age 52–53); Liverpool, England
- Education: Leeds Metropolitan University; Edinburgh College of Art (MFA, 2000)
- Known for: Contemporary art, Sculpture, Drawing
- Movement: Conceptual art, Transformative art
- Awards: John Watson Prize, Scottish National Gallery of Modern Art (2000)

Jonathan Owen is a British contemporary artist born in Liverpool in 1973. He trained in Fine Art at Leeds Metropolitan University and completed an MFA at the Edinburgh College of Art in 2000. Inspired by the act of transformation, Owen’s work often involves painstaking processes that reveal new meanings from existing materials. In his two-dimensional eraser drawings, he meticulously removes ink from reproduced photographs in books using an ordinary rubber to create ghostly, altered images. In three dimensions, he re-carves classical marble sculptures and antique objects, revealing unexpected forms and spaces. Through these reductive techniques, Owen challenges viewers to reconsider authorship, permanence, and the layered histories embedded in familiar imagery and objects.

== Early life and education ==
Jonathan Owen was born in Liverpool in 1973 and later moved to Scotland, where he established his practice and academic career in Edinburgh. After completing his early studies in Fine Art at Leeds Metropolitan University, he pursued postgraduate research and graduated with an MFA from Edinburgh College of Art in 2000.

Following his formal education, Owen remained engaged with the academic environment and became active as a lecturer and researcher in art at the Edinburgh College of Art, University of Edinburgh, where he focuses on sculpture, drawing, and transformative processes. His work explores the systematic transformation of readymade objects and images, applying methods of collapse, destabilisation, and erasure to challenge traditional assumptions about material stability and artistic authorship.

== Artistic practice and themes ==
Jonathan Owen’s artistic practice is driven by a systematic process of reduction and removal, where making is achieved through subtractive rather than additive methods. He frequently engages with readymade objects and images, transforming them by eroding their original form to create new visual and conceptual propositions. Owen’s sculpture work often begins with antique marble statues and busts, which he deliberately re‑carves into destabilised and reconfigured versions of themselves. This intervention is intended to puncture familiar visual narratives and reactivate dormant cultural artefacts, challenging traditional hierarchies associated with historical monuments and ideals of permanence. In his drawing practice, Owen extends this reductive approach by using erasure as a form of two‑dimensional carving, carefully removing ink from printed photographs to reshape the background once the foreground figures have been erased. His work frequently engages with ideas around authorship, material transformation, and the residual traces left behind by removal, inviting viewers to reconsider the original meanings embedded within both sculpture and image.

== Eraser drawings and sculptural work ==
Jonathan Owen makes eraser drawings by carefully removing ink from printed photographs in books. This process often erases central figures, leaving background details to become more noticeable. The drawings are created entirely by erasure rather than by adding marks, giving them a ghostly appearance. Owen’s work highlights absence and the traces left behind, drawing attention to parts of the image that might otherwise be overlooked.

In sculpture, Owen re-carves 19th-century marble statues and busts. He alters sections of the original figures, sometimes creating voids or abstract forms, while leaving other parts intact. These modifications encourage viewers to reconsider the relationship between the original object and its new form. Through both his drawings and carved sculptures, Owen challenges the viewer to engage with the material and cultural afterlives of familiar imagery, highlighting how absence and removal can generate new meanings and visual narratives.

== Awards ==
Jonathan Owen won the John Watson Prize from the Scottish National Gallery of Modern Art in 2000 for his work I Don’t Usually Do This, a blue line drawing created during the year he completed his MFA.
