= Jonathan Lomas (researcher) =

British-Canadian health researcher

Jonathan Lomas (born June 21, 1952, in Swansea, Wales) is a British-Canadian health researcher and the inaugural chief executive officer of the Canadian Health Services Research Foundation (CHSRF). He specializes in health services research and knowledge translation/exchange and has been called the "godfather of knowledge translation" by the Canadian Institutes for Health Research. Lomas became an Officer of the Order of Canada in 2010.

== Early life and education ==
Lomas was born on June 21, 1952, in Swansea, Wales, but spent most of his childhood in England. He obtained an undergraduate degree in experimental psychology from Oxford University in the early 1970s before moving to Canada as a Commonwealth Scholar. He obtained a master's degree in psychology from the University of Western Ontario in 1975.

== Career ==
Between 1982 and 1997 Lomas was a Professor of Health Policy Analysis in the Department of Clinical Epidemiology and Biostatistics at McMaster University where, along with Greg Stoddart, he co-founded the Centre for Health Economics and Policy Analysis (CHEPA), an applied research group with a strong emphasis on research dissemination and uptake.

In 1997 he became the inaugural CEO of the Canadian Health Services Research Foundation (CHSRF), a nationally endowed organization founded to improve the relevance and use of health services research in health system decision-making.

Lomas has been a consultant to national and provincial governments in Canada, and also to non-governmental organizations, task forces and inquiries. He has worked on international health issues as a consultant for the World Health Organization, the World Bank, the International Development Research Centre and the Rockefeller Foundation in Indonesia, Sri Lanka, The Philippines, South Korea, Myanmar (Burma), Thailand and Australia. He has been a visiting professor or scientist at the University of Gadjah Mada in Indonesia (1990), the University of Sydney, Australia (where he was also a visiting scholar in the Department of Health of the New South Wales Government) (1996/97), and the Dutch national research and development agency ZonMw (2004).

Lomas has published two books. He has also published many peer reviewed articles and book chapters in the area of health policy and health services research. He is recognized as an international leader for his work exploring the role and impact of research evidence in health systems decision-making and is seen in Canada as the "godfather of knowledge translation."

Lomas received an honorary doctorate from the University of Montreal in 2005 as part of the Department of Health Administration's 50th Anniversary celebrations. The Canadian Institutes of Health Research (CIHR) also recognized his achievements by establishing the Jonathan Lomas KT Doctoral Research Award Supplement in his honour. In 2006 he was elected as a Fellow of the Canadian Academy of Health Sciences (CAHS) and as a Specially Elected Fellow of the Royal Society of Canada.

Dr. Lomas became an Officer of the Order of Canada in January 2010; In 2012 he was awarded the Queen Elizabeth II Diamond Jubilee Medal.

== Personal life ==
Jonathan Lomas is now retired and lives in Victoria, British Columbia with his wife B.J. Porter.

In 1980, he ran as a New Democratic Party candidate in the Canadian federal election in Toronto's Don Valley West riding. He placed third, with 9.6% of the popular vote.
