= Jonathan Aronson =

American academic

Jonathan Aronson is professor of communication at the Annenberg School for Communication & Journalism at the University of Southern California as well as professor of international relations at USC.

Aronson writes on issues related to international communication policy, globalization and international trade and trade negotiations. His current research focuses on ways in which communication and network developments related to privacy, equity, standard setting, competition policy, and international intellectual property shape the path of globalization. His most recent writings consider the implications of new communications technologies for globalization and international communications competition.

His other books include Managing the World Economy: The Consequences of International Corporate Alliances (Council on Foreign Relations) and When Countries Talk: International Trade in Telecommunications Services (Ballinger) and Trade Talks: America Better Listen! (Council on Foreign Relations).

Aronson’s positions at USC have included: Director of USC’s School of International Relations and executive director of the Annenberg Center for Communication. He served as president of the Association of Professional School of International Affairs (APSIA), as a Council on Foreign Relations International Affairs fellow in the Office of the US Trade Representative, and is a member of the Council on Foreign Relations and the Pacific Council on International Affairs.

Aronson graduated from Harvard University with a bachelor's in government and received his Ph.D. in political science from Stanford University. He was awarded an honorary doctorate from Saint Petersburg State University.
