= Jonathan Wutawunashe =

Zimbabwean musician

Jonathan Wutawunashe is a songwriter, guitarist, keyboard player, and producer.

== Background ==
As leader of the gospel group Family Singers, he was the first star of Zimbabwean gospel. Wutawunashe produced, shot, and edited the music video for his wife Shuvai's hit "Nditorei". His family belongs to a megachurch called the Family of God Church. He was the second born in a family of five children. He has four siblings, Andrew, Erasmus, Edna, and Amos. His brother Andrew, referred to by church members as "Prophet," is the founder and leader of the church, which has branches all over the world.

== Discography ==
- "Vana Vanokosha"
- "Komborera"
- "It's No Secret"
- "To Be a Christian"
- "Glorious"
- "Helele"
- "Ndovimba"
- "You Can't Fall" (sung by Shuvai Wutawunashe)
- "Rudo Rukuru" (sung by Shuvai Wutawunashe)

Wutawunashe worked on African Praise, a praise medley for which he and Shuvai wrote many original songs. He has produced albums featuring up-and-coming artists, as well as Family Singers. Since 1994, he has shared his recording studio with other gospel artists. Wutawunashe launched Gospel Bandstand with his wife, a TV show showcasing new gospel talent.
