= Jonathan Low =

New Zealand entrepreneur, vlogger, and internet personality

- Other name: Patchy
- Occupations: Vlogger, entrepreneur
- Years active: 2023–present
- Known for: Patchy's Coffee, YouTube "Rags to Riches" series

Jonathan Low (born c. 1990s), better known online as Patchy, is a New Zealand social media personality, vlogger, and street entrepreneur based in Auckland. He initially gained national media attention for setting up "Patchy's Coffee", an informal instant-coffee trolley in the Auckland CBD while living out of his vehicle, and later for documenting his self-imposed homelessness in a YouTube video series titled "Rags to Riches".

== Background ==
Low initially worked as an Uber driver in Auckland while living out of his car following a marriage breakdown. After his vehicle was stolen during a delivery, he was left without accommodation or income and began sleeping rough in the Auckland central business district.

Refusing to rely solely on begging, Low saved $90 from cash tips to purchase a kettle, thermos flask, and coffee supplies. Operating out of a modified shopping trolley on Queen Street, he sold instant coffee and cookies at discounted prices as Patchy's Coffee. After posting videos of his operation on TikTok, his story went viral and was featured across New Zealand media outlets. Crowdfunding efforts via Givealittle were subsequently launched to help him transition the operation into a formal commercial premises; however, the business ultimately shut down amidst financial and operational challenges.

=== "Rags to Riches" YouTube series ===
In late 2026, Low launched a video series on his YouTube channel, Patchy's Coffee, titled "Rags to Riches". Unlike his previous period of involuntary homelessness, Low quit his employment as a truck driver in Kerikeri and gave up his rental accommodation, taking his final paycheck of approximately $2,000 to return to Auckland. The stated purpose of the series was to document an attempt to build a business empire starting from scratch on the street.
