= Jonathan Vosselman =

Dutch footballer

Personal information
- Full name: Jonathan Vosselman
- Date of birth: 14 June 1984 (age 42)
- Place of birth: Amsterdam, Netherlands
- Height: 1.75 m (5 ft 9 in)
- Position: Defender

Youth career
- SV Lelystad '67
- Be Quick '28
- FC Zwolle

Senior career*
Years	Team	Apps	(Gls)
2006–2011	Go Ahead Eagles	168	(0)
2011–2013	SC Cambuur	37	(0)
- * Club domestic league appearances and goals as of 11 January 2013

Jonathan Vosselman (born 14 June 1984 in Amsterdam, Netherlands) is a professional football defender who formerly played for Go Ahead Eagles.

He made his debut for Go Ahead Eagles in a 1–0 win over De Graafschap on 11 August 2006. Vosselman played 36 games in the 2007–08 season. In the 2008–09 season he played also 36 games.

In July 2011, Vosselman moved to SC Cambuur on a two-year contract. He left the club in January 2013 after losing his chance of play time.
