= Jonathan van der Werff =

British soldier, judge, and author

Jonathan van der Werff, also known by his pen name James Ervine (died 1 April 2026), was a British soldier, judge, and author.
