= Jonathan Webster =

American linguist

- Born: United States
- Education: State University of New York at Buffalo
- Known for: Systemic functional linguistics
- Scientific career
- Fields: Linguistics
- Workplaces: City University of Hong Kong

Jonathan J. Webster is a professor in linguistics in the Department of Linguistics and Translation at City University of Hong Kong. He received his PhD from the State University of New York at Buffalo in linguistics.
