= Jonathan Velasco =

Venezuelan diplomat

Jonathan Velasco Ramírez is a Venezuelan diplomat who serves as Venezuela's ambassador to Iraq. During the Venezuelan presidential crisis, on February 2, 2019, Velasco recognized Juan Guaidó as interim president of Venezuela, stating that the National Assembly was the only power "attached to ethics, legitimacy and legality" and responsible for filling the void of power created by the violation of the constitution."
