= Jonathan Palata =

British boxer

Jonathan Palata is a British heavyweight boxer with a professional record of 7-1 (3).

Born in the Congo, Palata moved to South London at 18 months of age where he grew up in Bellingham and after being taught the basics by his father, he boxed at Palmer's Academy from the age of 14.

After a hiatus he resumed boxing in 2011 collating a record of 36 wins from 40 fights including silver at the 2014 Haringey Cup and winning the London ABA's in 2015, knocking down opponent Ozzie Osimodrie en route to a points victory.

In 2018, Palata became a professional boxer contracted to Goodwin Boxing.

Palata is currently inactive with a record of 7 wins (3 knockouts) and 1 loss.
