= Jonathan Cockcroft =

English cricketer (born 1977)

Personal information
- Full name: Jonathan Richard Cockcroft
- Born: 28 May 1977 (age 49); Bradford, Yorkshire, England
- Batting: Right-handed
- Bowling: Leg break

Domestic team information
- Years: Team
- 1997–1998: Oxford University

Career statistics
Competition	First-class
Matches	3
Runs scored	19
Batting average	19.00
100s/50s	–/–
Top score	18*
Balls bowled	120
Wickets	0
Bowling average	–
5 wickets in innings	–
10 wickets in match	–
Best bowling	–
Catches/stumpings	–/–
- Source: Cricinfo, 23 February 2020

Jonathan Richard Cockcroft (born 28 May 1977) is an English former first-class cricketer.

Cockcroft was born in Bradford in May 1977. He later studied at Oriel College at the University of Oxford. While studying at Oxford, he played first-class cricket for Oxford University in 1997 and 1998, making three appearances against Essex, Sussex and Hampshire. He scored a total of 19 runs in these matches, in addition to bowling 20 wicket-less overs with his leg break bowling. Cockcroft is currently employed as Chief Executive of Bowls England, having also been Commercial Director of England Hockey.
