= Jonathan Campbell (theologian) =

British theologian (born 1964)

Jonathan G Campbell (born 1964) was a Senior Lecturer in Biblical Studies & Early Judaism in the Department of Theology and Religious Studies at the University of Bristol in Bristol, United Kingdom. He retired in 2017.

He was an undergraduate at the University of Aberdeen from 1982 until 1986 and then a postgraduate at Oxford University until 1990. He began teaching at the University of Wales, Lampeter as lecturer in Theology & Religious Studies in 1991 before moving to Bristol in 1996.

Campbell's main research work is on Second Temple Judaism in general and on the Dead Sea Scrolls from Qumran in particular. Because these Scrolls have such important repercussions across several interrelated disciplines, he is also interested in the emergence of both Rabbinic Judaism and Christianity out of the Judaism of the Second Temple period (circa 515 BCE - 70 CE). He has further interests in the theological impact of academic study of the Bible and of Jewish and Christian history on Judaism and Christianity in the contemporary world.

== Select bibliography ==
- 'Unity and Diversity in Contemporary Antisemitism: The Bristol–Sheffield Hallam Colloquium on Contemporary Antisemitism' (Boston, USA: Academic Studies Press, 2019); co-edited with Lesley D. Klaff.
- 'New Directions in Qumran Studies: Proceedings from the Bristol Colloquium on the Dead Sea Scrolls, 8-10th - September 2003' (London: Continuum, 2005); co-edited with W.J. Lyons and L.K. Pietersen.
- 'The Exegetical Texts' (CQS 4: London: T & T Clark International, 2004).
- 'Zwoje Znad Morza Martwego Rozszyfrowane' (Warsaw: Amber Books, 1998).
- 'Deciphering the Dead Sea Scrolls' (1st edition; London: HarperCollins, 1996).
- 'Deciphering the Dead Sea Scrolls' (2nd edition. Oxford: Blackwell, 2002).
- 'The Use of Scripture in the Damascus Document 1-8, 19-20' (Berlin: de Gruyter, 1995).
