= Jonathan Tumukunde =

Ugandan volleyball player

Jonathan Tumukunde (born 18 August 1998) is a Ugandan volleyball player who plays in the position of opposite hitter. He is a member of the Uganda national volleyball team.

== Career ==
Tumukunde has played for Nemostrats which he joined through the OBB (Orange Block Busters) volleyball club at the end of 2022 of national volleyball league finals.

== Awards ==
in May of 2025, Tumukunde was recognized as the volleyball player of the month at the Fortbet Real Stars Awards.
