= Jonathan Hutchinson (died 1711) =

English politician (died 1711)

Jonathan Hutchinson (c. 1662 – 11 June 1711) was an English politician. He sat as MP for Berwick-upon-Tweed from 9 February 1702 till his death on 11 June 1711.

He was the first son of William Hutchinson (died 1690) and Ruth Hodgson. On 2 June 1679, he married Mary, the daughter of Ambrose Barnes. They had one son who predeceased him and one daughter.
