= Jonathan Cherki =

French entrepreneur and CEO

- Born: April 1, 1986 (age 40); Marseille, France
- Occupations: Entrepreneur, businessperson, investor
- Years active: 2012–present
- Known for: CEO of Contentsquare
- Honours: one of the 100 Most Intriguing Entrepreneurs of 2021 by Goldman Sachs

Jonathan Cherki is a French entrepreneur and CEO of technology firm Contentsquare.

He was born in Marseille, France and studied in ESSEC Business School. In 2012, while studying at ESSEC, he founded Contentsquare, a company responsible for digital experience analytics.

Cherki has been named among 100 "personalities who give meaning to digital technology" by Alliancy.
