= Jonathan Hudson Connell =

American electrical engineer

Jonathan Hudson Connell is a computer scientist formerly at the IBM T.J. Watson Research Center in Yorktown Heights, New York.

Connell was named a Fellow of the Institute of Electrical and Electronics Engineers (IEEE) in 2013 for his contributions to security and privacy in biometrics.

He is the author of 3 books and over 100 US patents (e.g. US 8,244,649).

Recently he has been investigating the use of English as a programming language for robots, believing that humans are largely programmed also.
