= Jonathan Famery =

French footballer (born 1988)

Personal information
- Date of birth: 13 July 1988 (age 38)
- Place of birth: Villeurbanne, France
- Height: 1.75 m (5 ft 9 in)
- Position: Attacking midfielder

Senior career*
Years	Team	Apps	(Gls)
2000-2006	PSG	250	(45)
2006-2008	Louhans-Cuiseaux FC	14	(1)
2008-2010	Dijon	20	(0)
2010-2011	Gueugnon	27	(4)
2011-2012	Bayonne	29	(3)
2012–2013	Red Star	10	(2)
Total		348	(57)
- * Club domestic league appearances and goals

Jonathan Famery (born 13 July 1988) is a French former professional footballer who played as an attacking midfielder.
