= Cardoso (surname) =

Cardoso, sometimes in the archaic spelling Cardozo, is a Portuguese, Galician and Spanish surname. Notable people with the surname include:

- Abraham Miguel Cardoso (1626–1706), Spanish physician and prophet
- Anderson Rodrigues Cardoso, Brazilian football striker
- Anderson Sebastião Cardoso (born 1981), Brazilian central defender
- Antonio Dias Cardoso (1933–2006), Angolan politician and writer
- Amadeo de Souza Cardoso (1887–1918), Portuguese painter
- Sidónio Bernardino Cardoso da Silva Pais (1872–1918), Portuguese politician and President (1918)
- Bill Cardoso (1937–2006), American journalist
- Bruno Cardoso (born 1984), Brazilian goalkeeper
- Bruno Rendón Cardoso (born 2000), Cuban footballer
- Carlos Cardoso (disambiguation), multiple people
- Celina Cardoso, last President and Secretary of the National Council of Cuban Scouting
- Daniel Cardoso (born 1989), South African footballer
- David Cardoso (born 1994) Macanese footballer
- Elijah Aboab Cardoso, 17c philanthropist and founder of the Hamburg synagogue
- Elizete Cardoso (1920–1990), Brazilian singer and actress
- Esther Cardoso, Cuban film and theatre actress, produce, director and educator
- Fábio Cardoso (born 1994), Portuguese footballer
- Felipe Cardoso (born 2003), Brazilian footballer, survival of 2019 CT Ninho do Urubu fire
- Felippe Cardoso (born 1998), Brazilian footballer
- Fernando Henrique Cardoso (born 1931), President of Brazil (1995–2003)
- Flávio Cardoso (born 1980), Brazilian bicycle racer
- Guilherme "Bill" Cardoso, Brazilian-American entrepreneur, engineer, and scientist
- Inácio do Nascimento de Morais Cardoso (1811–1883), Portuguese cardinal
- Isa Cardoso (born 1997), Brazilian footballer
- Isaac Cardoso (died 1683), Jewish physician, philosopher, and polemic writer
- Izaura Cardoso (born 1968), Brazilian politician
- Jonatas Oliveira Cardoso (born 1983), Brazilian striker
- Jorge Cardoso (born 1949), Argentinian classical guitarist and composer
- José Cardoso Pires (1925–1998), Portuguese author
- Jose Gabriel Cardoso Cardoso, Colombian chess grandmaster
- Jose Luis Cardoso (born 1975), Spanish motorcycle racer
- Kamilla Cardoso (born 2001), Brazilian basketball player
- Laura Cardoso (1927–2026), Brazilian actress
- Louise Cardoso (born 1955), Brazilian actress, producer and theatre instructor
- Lucas Cardoso (footballer, born 1996), Brazilian footballer
- Manuel Cardoso (composer) (1566–1650), Portuguese composer
- Marcel Silva Cardoso (born 1983), Brazilian left back
- Miguel Cardoso (basketball) (born 1993), Portuguese basketball player
- Miguel Esteves Cardoso (born 1955), Portuguese writer, translator, critic and journalist
- Newton Cardoso (1938–2025), Brazilian politician
- Olga Cardoso (1934–2025), Portuguese radio announcer, television presenter and singer
- Patricia Cardoso, Colombian-American film director
- Paula Cardoso (journalist) (born 1979), Portuguese journalist and activist
- Phellipe Cardoso (born 2004), Brazilian footballer
- Rafael Cardoso (art historian) (born 1964), Brazilian art historian and writer
- Rafael Cardoso (born 1985), Brazilian actor
- Rodolfo Esteban Cardoso (born 1968), Argentine footballer and manager
- Rodolfo Tan Cardoso (1937–2013), Filipino chess player
- Rodrigo de Souza Cardoso (born 1982), Brazilian footballer
- Ruth Cardoso (1930–2008), Brazilian sociologist and author, wife of Fernando Henrique Cardoso
- Thiago Cardoso (born 1991), Brazilian footballer
- Tiago Cardoso, Brazilian footballer
- Vanderlan Cardoso (born 1962), Brazilian businessman and politician
- Waldemar Levy Cardoso (1900–2009), Brazilian military officer
- Willian Cardoso (born 1986), Brazilian surfer
- Zélia Cardoso de Mello (born 1953), Brazilian economist, former Minister of Economy
