= Jhonatan =

Jhonatan is a given name, a variant spelling of Jonathan. Jhonatan may refer to:

- Jhonatan Jardines Fraire (born 1980), Mexican politician
- Jhonatan Solano (born 1985), Colombian baseball catcher
- Jhonatan Luz (born 1987), Brazilian basketball player
- Jhonatan Bernardo (born 1988), Brazilian football striker
- Jhonatan Longhi (born 1988), Brazilian alpine skier
- Jhonathan Camargo (born 1988), Venezuelan road cyclist
- Jhonatan Esquivel (born 1988), Uruguayan rower
- Jhonatan Rojas (born 1988), Colombian football forward
- Jhonatan (footballer, born 1989), full name Jhonatan da Silva Pereira, Brazilian football striker
- Jhonatan (footballer, born 2002), full name Jhonatan dos Santos Rosa, Brazilian football midfielder
- Jhonatan Restrepo (born 1994), Colombian cyclist
- Jhonatan Candia (born 1995), Uruguayan football forward
- Jhonatan Narváez (born 1997), Ecuadorian road racing cyclist
- Jhonatan Rivas (born 1998), Colombian weightlifter
- Jhonatan Amores (born 1998), Ecuadorian racewalker
- Jhonatan (footballer, born 1991), full name Jhonatan Luiz da Siqueira, Brazilian football goalkeeper

== See also ==
- Jonata (born 1997), full name Jonata de Oliveira Bastos, Brazilian football forward
- Jonathan (disambiguation)
- Jonatan
- Jhonathan
