= Jhonathan =

Jhonathan is a given name, a variant spelling of Jonathan. Jhonathan may refer to:

- Jhonathan Díaz (born 1996), Venezuelan baseball pitcher
- Jhonathan Camargo (born 1988), Venezuelan cyclist
- Jhonathan Lazcano (born 1992), Mexican manager
- Jhonathan Bravo (born 1985), Peruvian retired football player
- Jhonatan Luz (born 1987), also known as Jhonathan, Brazilian basketball player

== Other ==
- Jhonathan and the Witchs, a story by Stephen King

== See also ==
- Jonata (born 1997), full name Jonata de Oliveira Bastos, Brazilian football forward
- Jonathan (disambiguation)
- Jonatan
- Jhonatan
