= Jonatas =

Other names
- Alternative spelling: Jônatas (Brazilian Portuguese); Jónatas (European Portuguese)
- Nickname: Jon
- Anglicisation: Jonathan
- Related names: Jonatã (Another way to spell Jonathan in Portuguese)

Jonatas, Jônatas or Jónatas is a masculine name, the Portuguese form of the English name Jonathan.

== Personalities ==
- Jônatas (footballer, born 1982), full name Jônatas Domingos, Brazilian football midfielder
- Jonatas (footballer, born 1983), full name Jonatas Oliveira Cardoso, Brazilian football striker
- Jônatas Obina (born 1985), Equatoguinean football forward
- Jonatas Faro (born 1987), Brazilian actor
- Jonatas Belusso (born 1988), Brazilian football striker

== See also ==
- Jonata (born 1997), full name Jonata de Oliveira Bastos, Brazilian football forward
- Jonathan (disambiguation)
- Jonatan
