= Paula Cardoso =

Paula Cardoso may refer to:

- Paula Cardoso (journalist)
- Paula Cardoso (politician)
