= Jonathan Gilbert (disambiguation) =

Jonathan Gilbert may refer to:

- Jonathan Gilbert (born 1967), U.S. television and film actor
- Jonathan Gilbert (diplomat) (born 1977), Australian diplomat

== See also ==
- Jonathan (disambiguation)
- Gilbert (disambiguation)
