= The Scream =

1893 painting by Edvard Munch

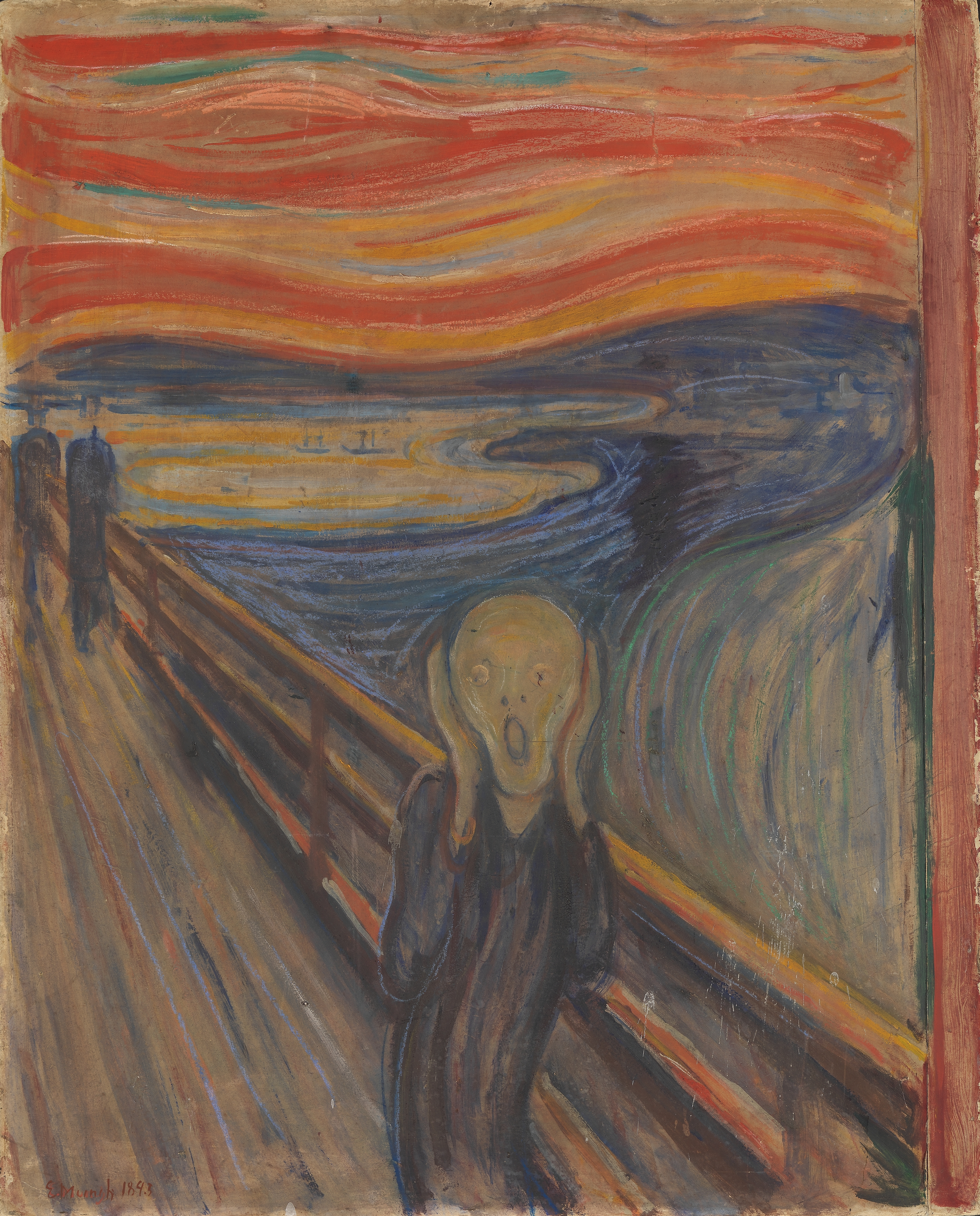
- Artist: Edvard Munch
- Year: 1893; 133 years ago
- Type: Oil, tempera, pastel, and crayon on cardboard
- Movement: Proto-Expressionism
- Dimensions: 91 cm × 73.5 cm (36 in × 28.9 in)
- Location: National Museum and Munch Museum, Oslo

The Scream is an image first created by the Norwegian artist Edvard Munch in 1893, and later repeated by him in different versions. The agonized face in the painting has become one of the most iconic images in art, seen as representing a profound experience of existential dread related to the human condition. Munch's work, including The Scream, had a formative influence on the Expressionist movement.

Munch recalled that he had been out for a walk at sunset when suddenly the setting sun's light turned the clouds "a blood red". He sensed an "infinite scream passing through nature". Scholars have located the spot along a fjord path overlooking Oslo and have suggested various explanations for the unnaturally orange sky, ranging from the effects of a volcanic eruption to a psychological reaction by Munch to his sister's involuntary commitment at a nearby lunatic asylum.

Munch created two versions in paint and two in pastels, as well as a lithograph stone from which several prints survive. Both painted versions have been stolen from public museums, but since recovered. In 2012, one of the pastel versions commanded the highest nominal price paid for an artwork at a public auction at that time.

The Norwegian name of the piece is Skrik ('Scream'), and the German title under which it was first exhibited is Der Schrei der Natur ('The Scream of Nature').

== Sources of inspiration ==
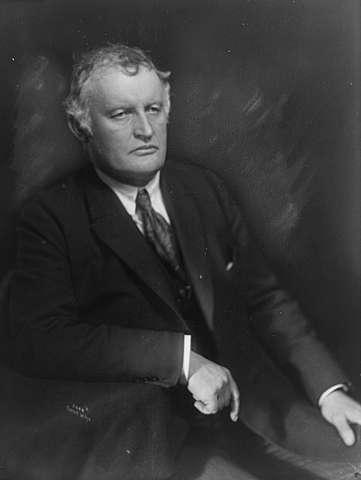
Edvard Munch, 1921

In his diary in an entry headed "Nice 22 January 1892", Munch wrote:

One evening I was walking along a path, the city was on one side and the fjord below. I felt tired and ill. I stopped and looked out over the fjord – the sun was setting, and the clouds turning blood red. I sensed a scream passing through nature; it seemed to me that I heard the scream. I painted this picture, painted the clouds as actual blood. The color shrieked. This became The Scream.

He later described his inspiration for the image:

I was walking along the road with two friends – the sun was setting – suddenly the sky turned blood red – I paused, feeling exhausted, and leaned on the fence – there was blood and tongues of fire above the blue-black fjord and the city – my friends walked on, and I stood there trembling with anxiety – and I sensed an infinite scream passing through nature.

Some scholars believe, based upon these accounts, that Munch was describing a panic attack.

Among theories advanced to account for the reddish sky in the background is the artist's memory of the effects of the powerful volcanic eruption of Krakatoa, which deeply tinted sunset skies red in parts of the Western hemisphere for months during 1883 and 1884, about a decade before Munch painted The Scream. This explanation has been disputed by scholars, who note that Munch was an expressive painter and was not primarily interested in literal renderings of what he had seen. Another explanation for the red skies is that they are due to the appearance of nacreous clouds which occur at the latitude of Norway and which look remarkably similar to the skies depicted in The Scream. Alternatively, it has been suggested that the proximity of both a slaughterhouse and a lunatic asylum to the site depicted in the painting may have offered some inspiration. The scene was identified as being the view from a road overlooking Oslo, by the Oslofjord and Hovedøya, from the hill of Ekeberg. At the time of painting the work, Munch's manic depressive sister Laura Catherine was a patient at the mental asylum at the foot of Ekeberg.

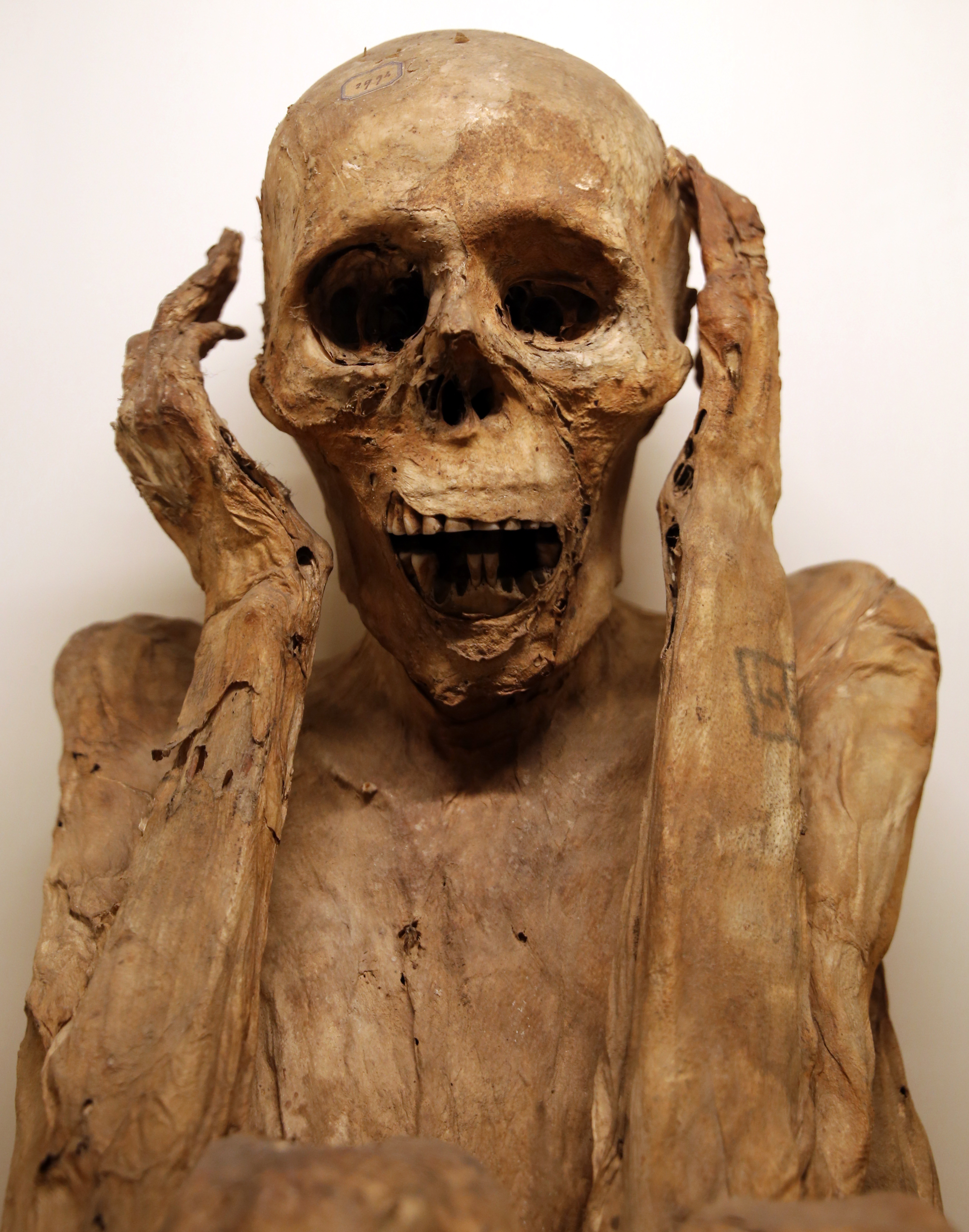
A Peruvian mummy at La Specola, Florence

In 1978, the Munch scholar Robert Rosenblum suggested that the strange, skeletal creature in the foreground of the painting was inspired by a Peruvian mummy, which Munch, like Paul Gauguin, could have seen at the 1889 Exposition Universelle in Paris. This mummy, which was buried in a fetal position with its hands alongside its face, also struck the imagination of Gauguin: it stood as a model for figures in more than twenty of Gauguin's paintings, among those the central figure in his painting Human misery (Grape harvest at Arles) and for the old woman at the left in his 1897 painting Where Do We Come From? What Are We? Where Are We Going?. In 2004, Italian anthropologist Piero Mannucci speculated that Munch might have seen a mummy in Florence's Museum of Natural History which bears an even more striking resemblance to the painting. However, later studies have disputed that theory, as Munch did not visit Florence until after painting The Scream.

The imagery of The Scream has been compared to that which an individual suffering from depersonalization disorder experiences, a feeling of distortion of the environment and one's self.

Arthur Lubow has described The Scream as "an icon of modern art, a Mona Lisa for our time." It has been widely interpreted as representing the universal anxiety of modern humanity.

== Versions ==
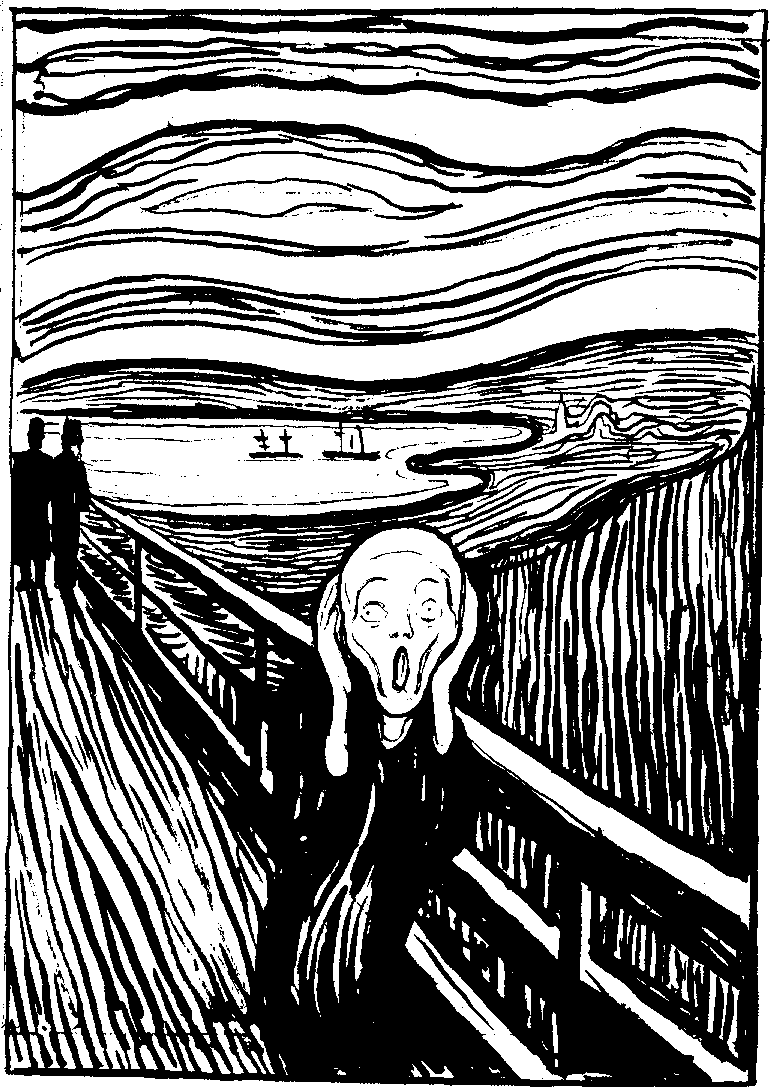
1895 lithography

Munch created four versions, two in paint and two in pastels. The first version was painted in 1893, between Berlin in Germany and Åsgårdstrand in Norway. It was exhibited the same year, alongside other artworks in a series which Munch called The Frieze of Life. It is in the collection of the National Museum of Norway in Oslo. This is the version that has the barely visible pencil inscription "Kan kun være malet af en gal Mand!" ("could only have been painted by a madman"). A pastel version from that year, which may have been a preliminary study, is in the collection of the Munch Museum, also in Oslo. The second pastel version, from 1895, was sold for $119,922,600 at Sotheby's Impressionist and Modern Art auction on 2 May 2012 to financier Leon Black. The second painted version dates from 1910, during a period when Munch revisited some of his prior compositions. It is also in the collection of the Munch Museum. These versions have seldom traveled, though the 1895 pastel was exhibited at the Museum of Modern Art in New York from October 2012 to April 2013, and the 1893 pastel was exhibited at the Van Gogh Museum in Amsterdam in 2015.

Additionally, Munch created a lithograph stone of the composition in 1895 from which several prints produced by Munch survive. Only approximately four dozen prints were made before the original stone was resurfaced by the printer in Munch's absence.

The material composition of the 1893 painted version was examined in 2010. The pigment analysis revealed the use of cadmium yellow, vermilion, ultramarine and viridian, among other pigments in use in the 19th century.

== Pencil inscription ==
The version held by the National Museum of Norway has a pencil inscription, in small lettering, in the upper left corner, saying "Kan kun være malet af en gal Mand!" ("could only have been painted by a madman!"). It can only be seen on close examination of the painting. This had been presumed to be a comment by a critic or a visitor to an exhibition. It was first noticed when the painting was exhibited in Copenhagen in 1904, eleven years after this version was painted. Following infrared photography, the study of the handwriting now shows that the comment was added by Munch. The theory has been put forward that Munch added the inscription after the critical comments made when the painting was first exhibited in Norway in October 1895. There is good evidence that Munch was deeply hurt by that criticism, being sensitive to the mental illness that was prevalent in his family.

== Thefts ==
The Scream has been the target of several thefts and theft attempts. Some damage has been suffered in these thefts.

Two men breaking into the National Museum of Art, Architecture and Design, Oslo, to steal the gallery's version (1893 tempera on cardboard) of The Scream, February 1994

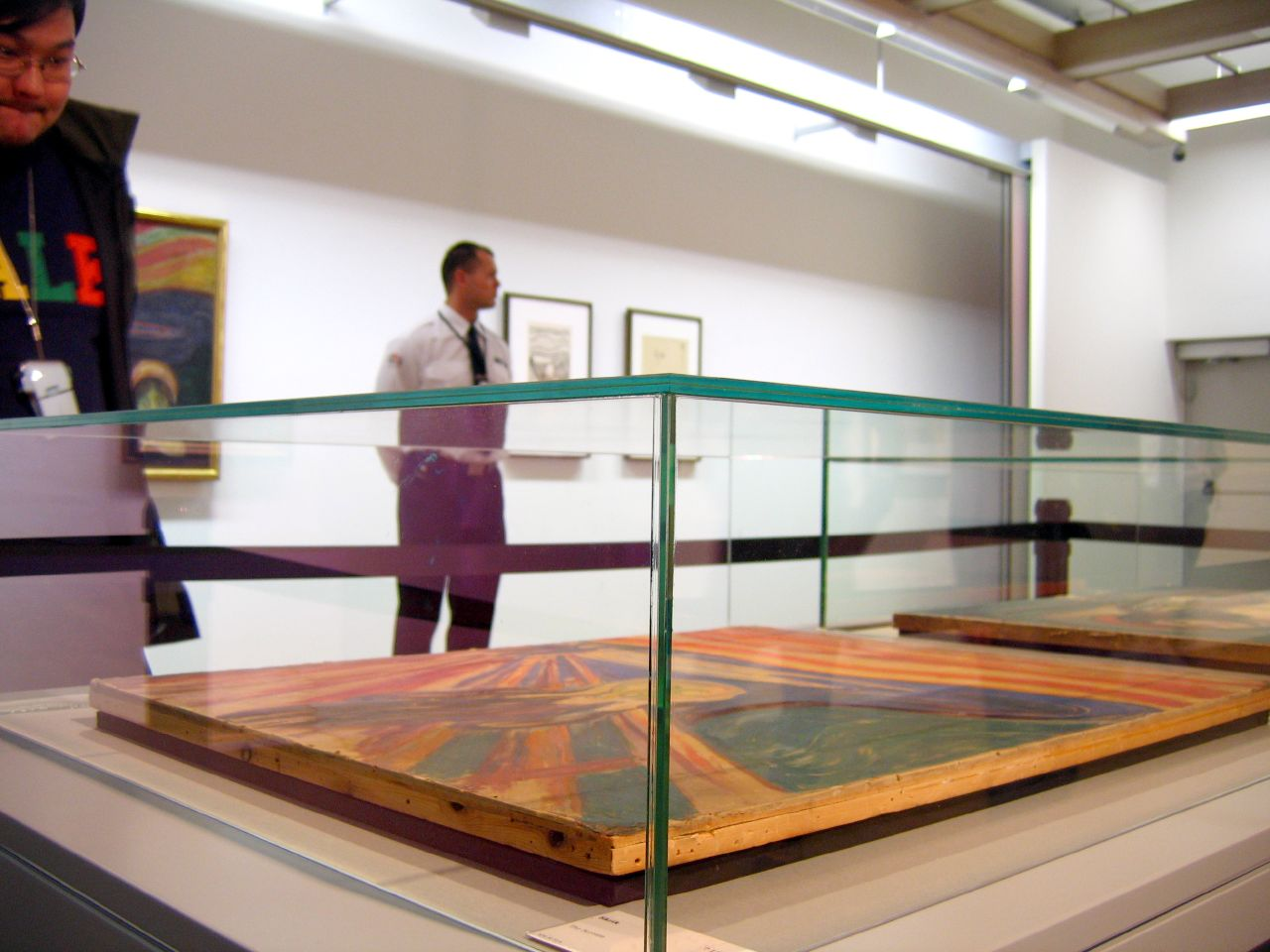
The Scream back in the Munch Museum after recovery and before restoration, September 2006

=== 1994 theft ===
On 12 February 1994, the same day as the opening of the 1994 Winter Olympics in Lillehammer, two men broke into the National Gallery, Oslo, and stole its version of The Scream, leaving a note reading "Thanks for the poor security". The painting had been moved down to a second-story gallery as part of the Olympic festivities. After the gallery refused to pay a ransom demand of US$1 million in March 1994, Norwegian police set up a sting operation with assistance from the British police (SO10) and the Getty Museum and the painting was recovered undamaged on 7 May 1994. In January 1996, four men were convicted in connection with the theft, including Pål Enger, who had been convicted of stealing Munch's Love and Pain in 1988. They were released on appeal on legal grounds: the British agents involved in the sting operation had entered Norway under false identities.

=== 2004 theft ===
The 1910 version of The Scream was stolen on 22 August 2004, during daylight hours, when masked gunmen entered the Munch Museum in Oslo and stole it and Munch's Madonna. A bystander photographed the robbers as they escaped to their car with the artwork. On 8 April 2005, Norwegian police arrested a suspect in connection with the theft, but the paintings remained missing and it was rumored that they had been burned by the thieves to destroy evidence. On 1 June 2005, with four suspects already in custody in connection with the crime, the city government of Oslo offered a reward of 2 million Norwegian krone (roughly US$313,500 or €231,200) for information that could help locate the paintings. Although the paintings remained missing, six men went on trial in early 2006, variously charged with either helping to plan or participating in the robbery. Three of the men were convicted and sentenced to between four and eight years in prison in May 2006, and two of the convicted, Bjørn Hoen and Petter Tharaldsen, were also ordered to pay compensation of 750 million kroner (roughly US$117.6 million or €86.7 million) to the City of Oslo. The Munch Museum was closed for ten months for a security overhaul.

On 31 August 2006, Norwegian police announced that a police operation had recovered both The Scream and Madonna, but did not reveal detailed circumstances of the recovery. The paintings were said to be in a better-than-expected condition. "We are 100 percent certain they are the originals," police chief Iver Stensrud told a news conference. "The damage was much less than feared." Munch Museum Director Ingebjørg Ydstie confirmed the condition of the paintings, saying it was much better than expected and that the damage could be repaired. The Scream had moisture damage on the lower left corner, while Madonna suffered several tears on the right side of the painting as well as two holes in Madonna's arm. Before repairs and restoration began, the paintings were put on public display by the Munch Museum beginning 27 September 2006. During the five-day exhibition, 5,500 people viewed the damaged paintings. The conserved works went back on display on 23 May 2008, when the exhibition "Scream and Madonna – Revisited" at the Munch Museum in Oslo displayed the paintings together.

In 2008 Idemitsu Petroleum Norge AS committed an endowment of 4 million Norwegian krone towards the conservation, research and presentation of The Scream and Madonna.

== Record sale at auction ==
The 1895 pastel-on-board version of the work, owned by Norwegian businessman Petter Olsen, sold at Sotheby's in New York for a record price of nearly US$120 million at auction on 2 May 2012. The bidding started at $40 million and lasted for over 12 minutes when American businessman Leon Black by phone gave the final offer of US$119,922,500, including the buyer's premium. Sotheby's described the work as "the most colorful and vibrant" of the four versions Munch painted, noting also his hand-colouring of the frame on which he inscribed his poem which detailed the picture's inspiration. After the sale, Sotheby's auctioneer Tobias Meyer said the work was "worth every penny", adding: "It is one of the great icons of art in the world and whoever bought it should be congratulated."

The auction was contested by the heirs of Hugo Simon, who sold it to Norwegian ship owner Thomas Olsen, Petter's father, "around 1937".

The previous record for the most expensive work of art sold at auction had been held by Picasso's Nude, Green Leaves and Bust, which went for US$106.5 million at Christie's two years prior on 4 May 2010. The work had a presale estimate of $80 million, the biggest presale estimate ever set by Sotheby's.

== In popular culture ==
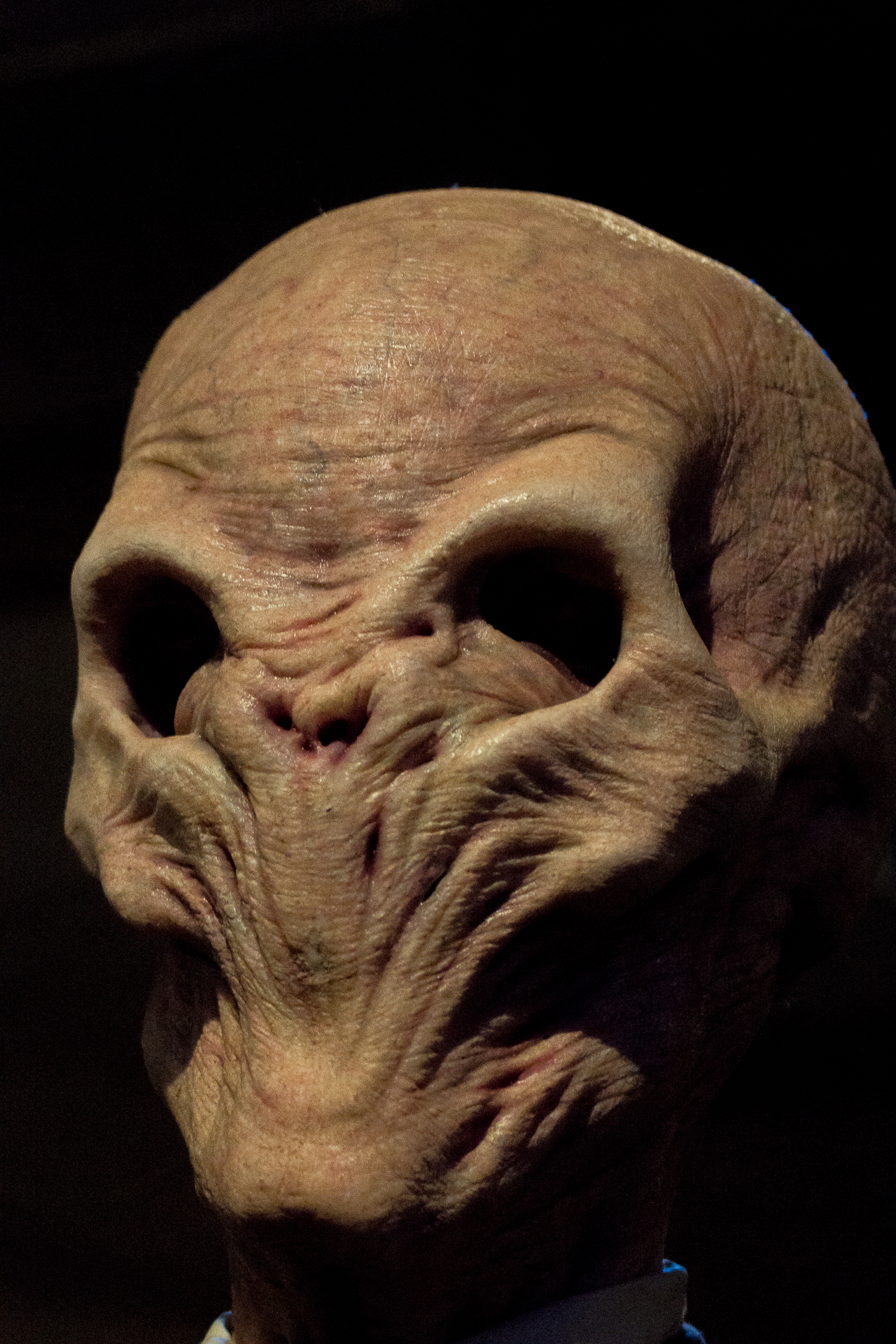
The Silents from Doctor Who have an appearance partially based on The Scream.

In Philip K. Dick's 1968 novel Do Androids Dream of Electric Sheep?, the main character and his partner, Phil Resch, view the painting in an art gallery. Resch comments that the painting reminds him of how he imagines androids feel.

In the late twentieth century, The Scream was imitated, parodied, and (following the expiration of its copyright) outright copied, which led to it acquiring an iconic status in popular culture. It was used on the cover of some editions of Arthur Janov's 1970 book The Primal Scream.

Happiness (1993), an illustration by Zeev Engelmayer after The Scream

Mark Jenkins, The Screamer (2015)

In 1983–1984, pop artist Andy Warhol made a series of silk screen prints copying works by Munch, including The Scream. His stated intention was to desacralize the painting by making it into a mass-reproducible object. Munch had already begun that process, however, by making a lithograph of the work for reproduction. Erró's ironic and irreverent treatment of Munch's masterpiece in his acrylic paintings The Second Scream (1967) and Ding Dong (1979) is considered a characteristic of post-modern art. Mark Jenkins exhibited a sex doll with its face replaced by The Scream at the Lazarides gallery in London in 2015. The expression of Kevin McCallister (Macaulay Culkin) in the poster for the 1990 film Home Alone was inspired by The Scream.

The Silents, fictional alien antagonists introduced in 2011 in the BBC series Doctor Who, have an appearance partially based on The Scream.

In 2013, The Scream was one of four paintings that the Norwegian postal service chose for a series of stamps marking the 150th anniversary of Edvard Munch's birth. In 2018 Norwegian comedy duo Ylvis made a musical based on the painting's theft starring Pål Enger who stole it in 1994.

A patient resource group for trigeminal neuralgia (which has been described as the most painful condition in existence) have also adopted the image as a symbol of the condition.

In most renderings, the emoji U+1F631 😱 FACE SCREAMING IN FEAR is made to resemble the subject of the painting.

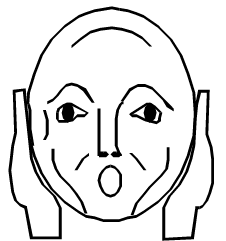
US Department of Energy Scream

A simplified version of the subject of the painting is one of the pictographs that was considered by the US Department of Energy for use as a non-language-specific symbol of danger to warn future human civilizations of the presence of radioactive waste.

The cover art for the 2018 MGMT album Little Dark Age shows a figure resembling the subject of the painting, albeit in clown-like makeup.

Despite popular opinion to the contrary, the Ghostface mask worn by the primary antagonists of the Scream series of horror was not inspired by the Munch painting. The mask, discovered by Marianne Maddalena and Wes Craven, was created in 1991 by Brigitte Sleiertin of the Fun World novelty company for the Halloween market. She based her concept drawings on old cartoons, such as those created by Max Fleischer.

== Gallery ==
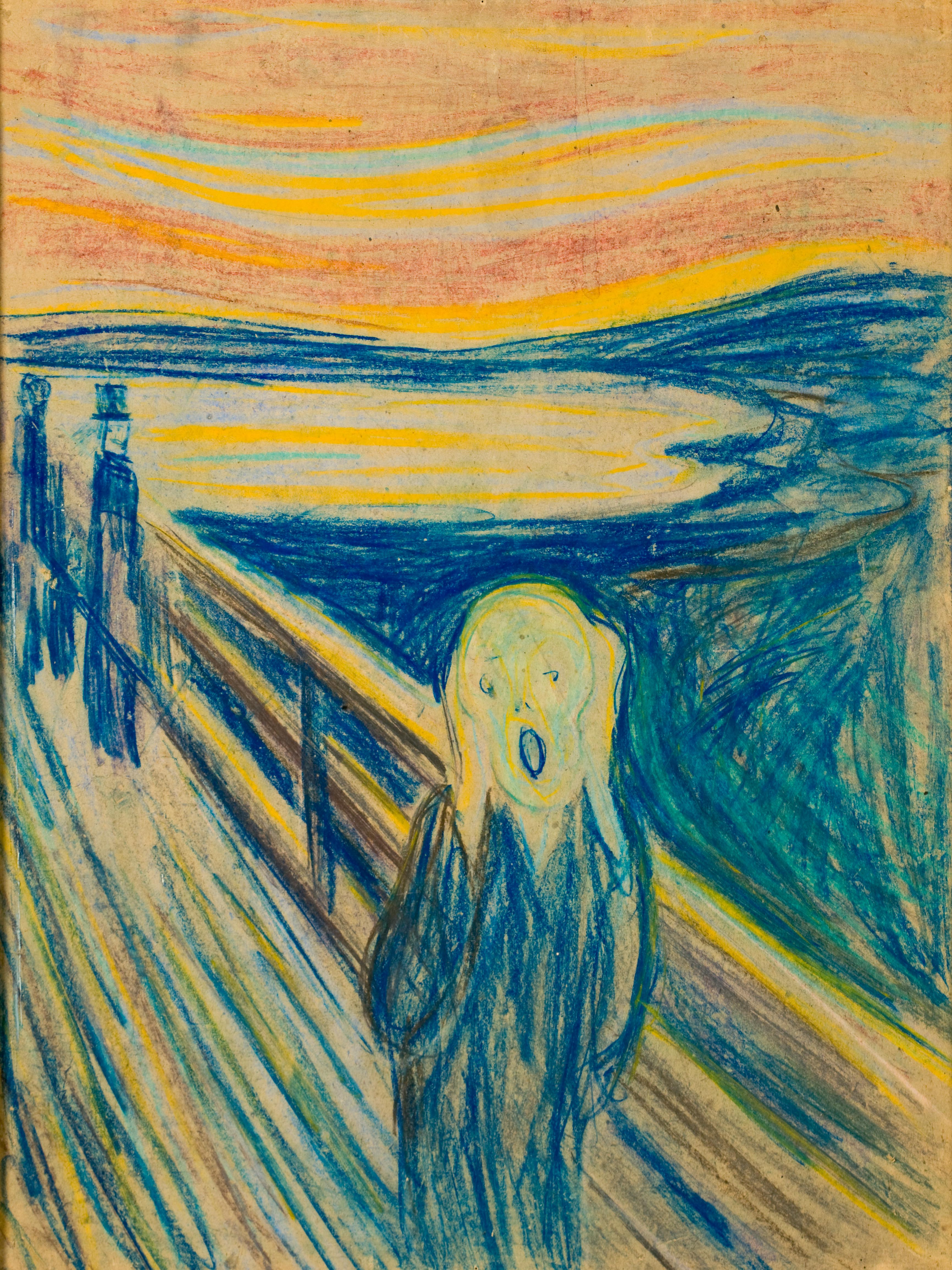
1893, pastel on cardboard. As possibly the earliest execution of The Scream, this appears to be the version in which Munch mapped out the essentials of the composition.

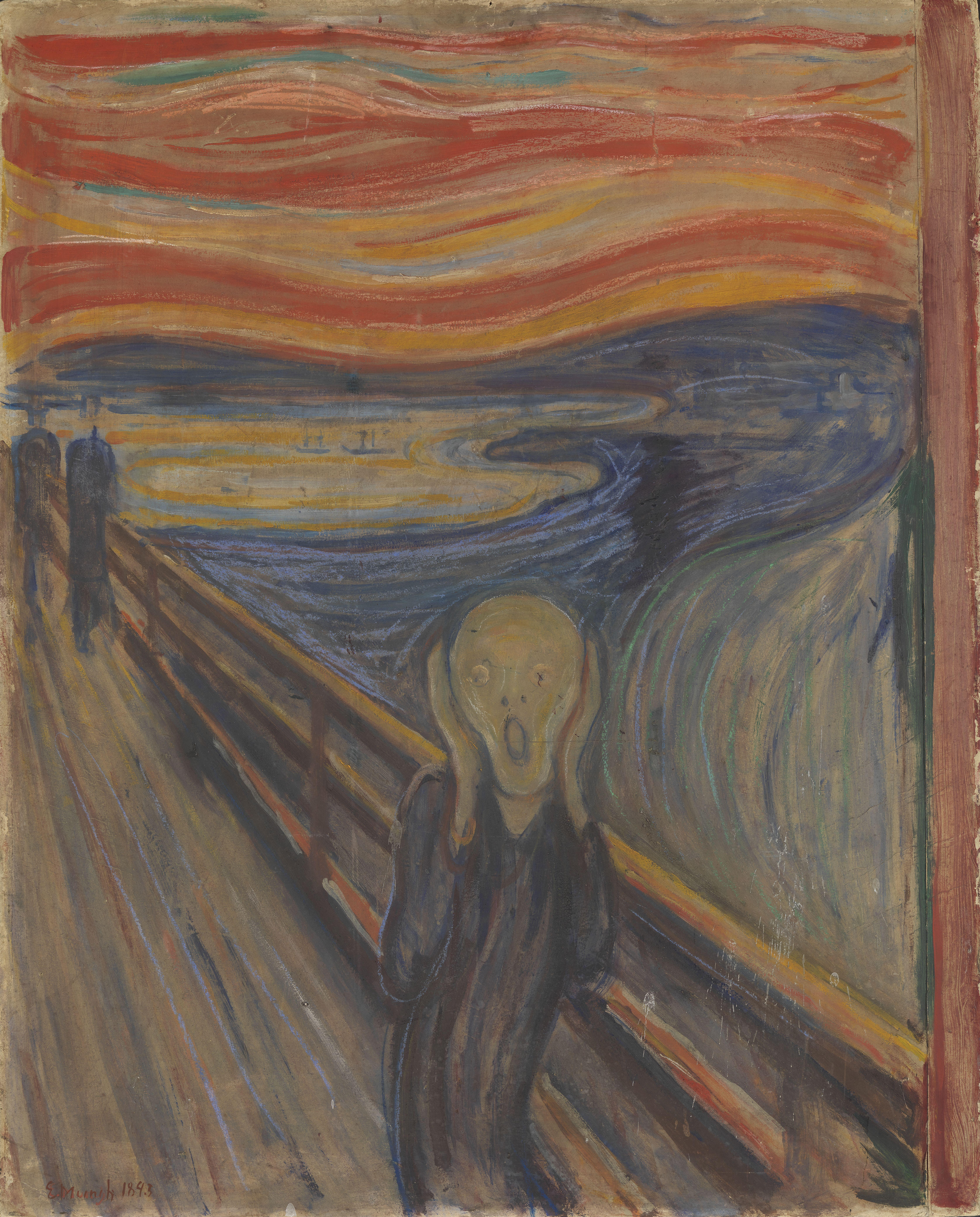
1893, oil, tempera and pastel on cardboard. The first version publicly displayed, and perhaps the most recognizable, is located at the National Museum of Norway in Oslo.

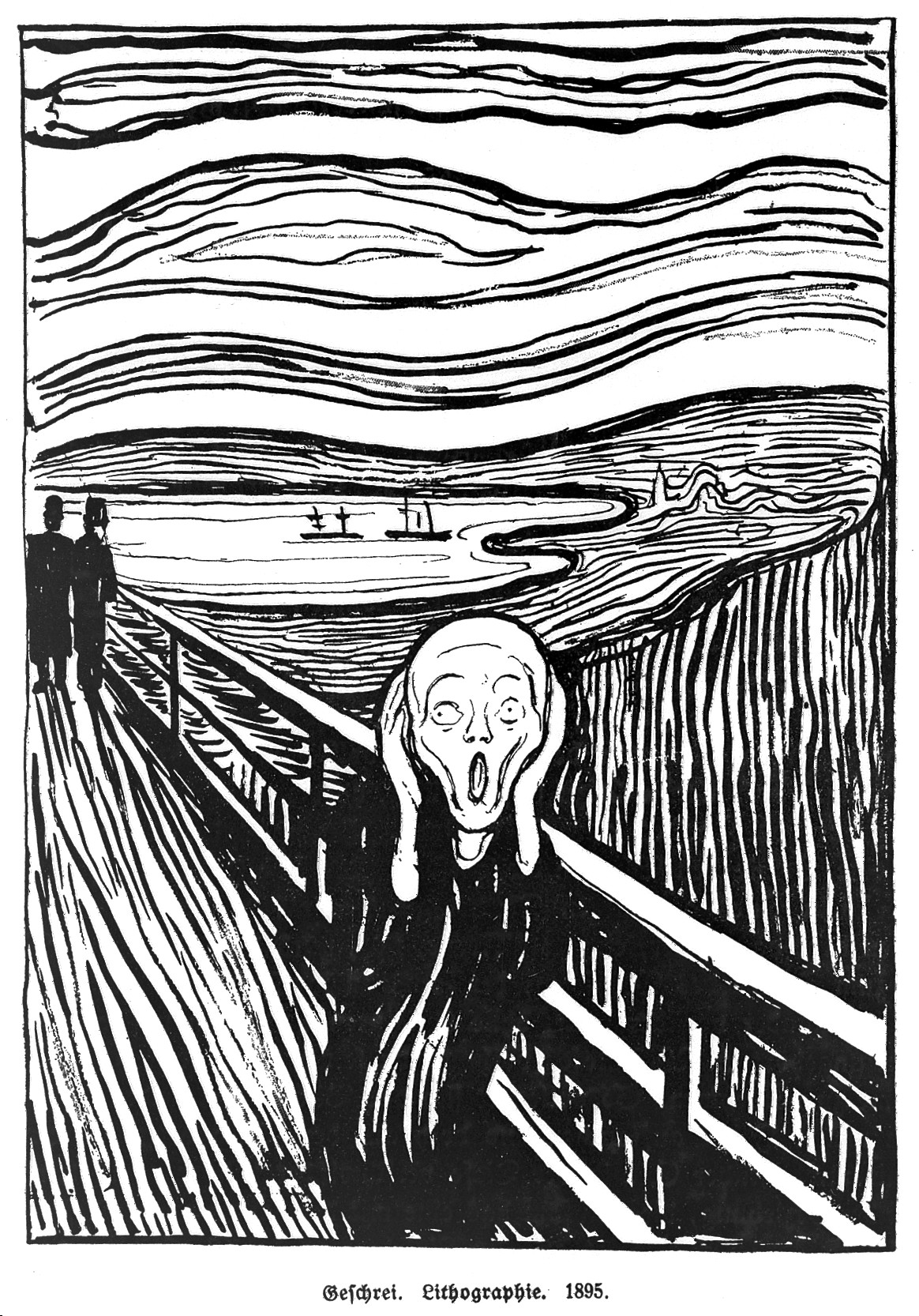
1895, lithograph print. About 45 prints were made before the printer re-used the lithograph stone. A few were hand-coloured by Munch.

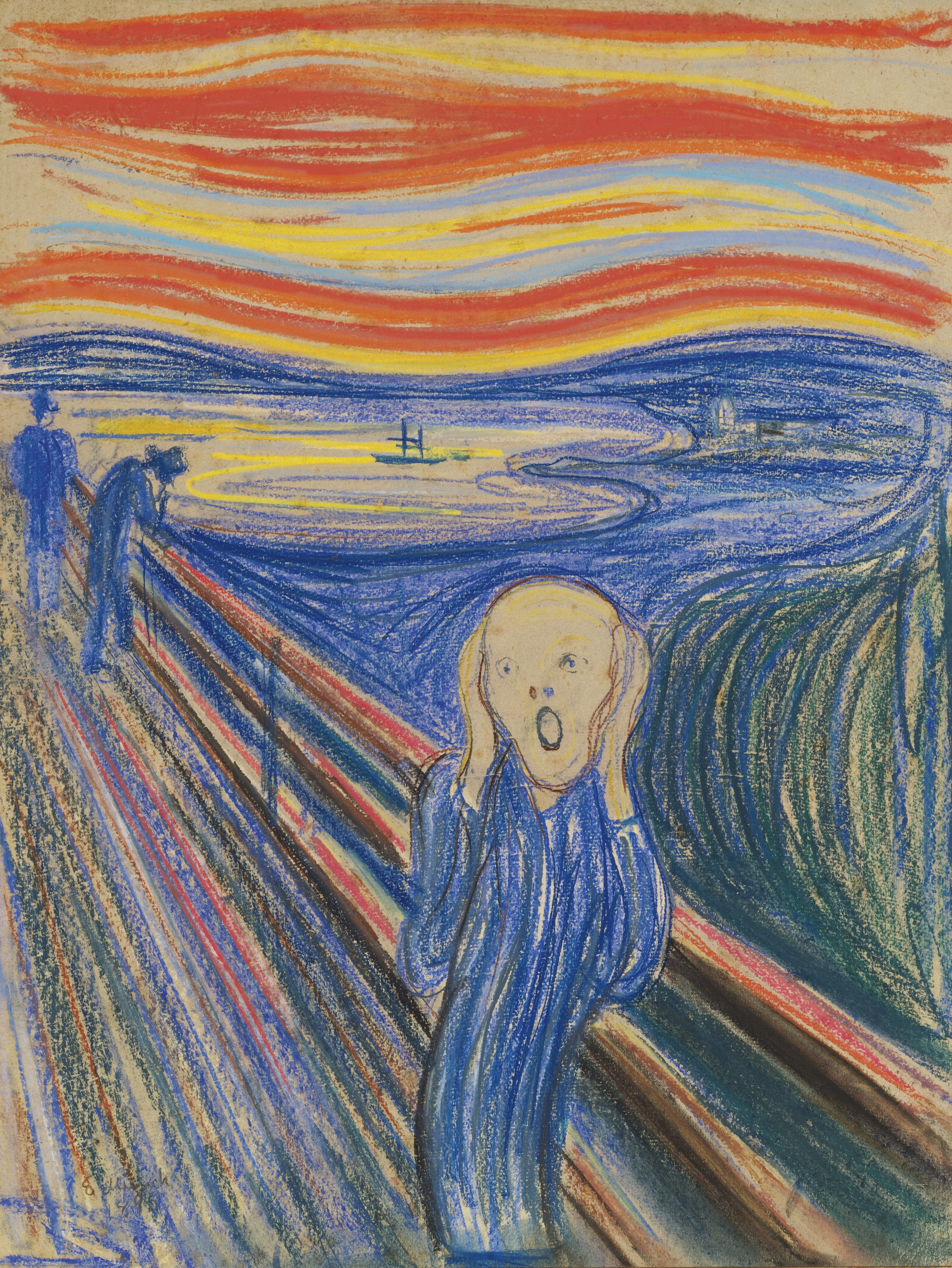
1895, pastel on cardboard. It was sold for nearly US$120 million at Sotheby's in 2012 and is in the private collection of Leon Black.

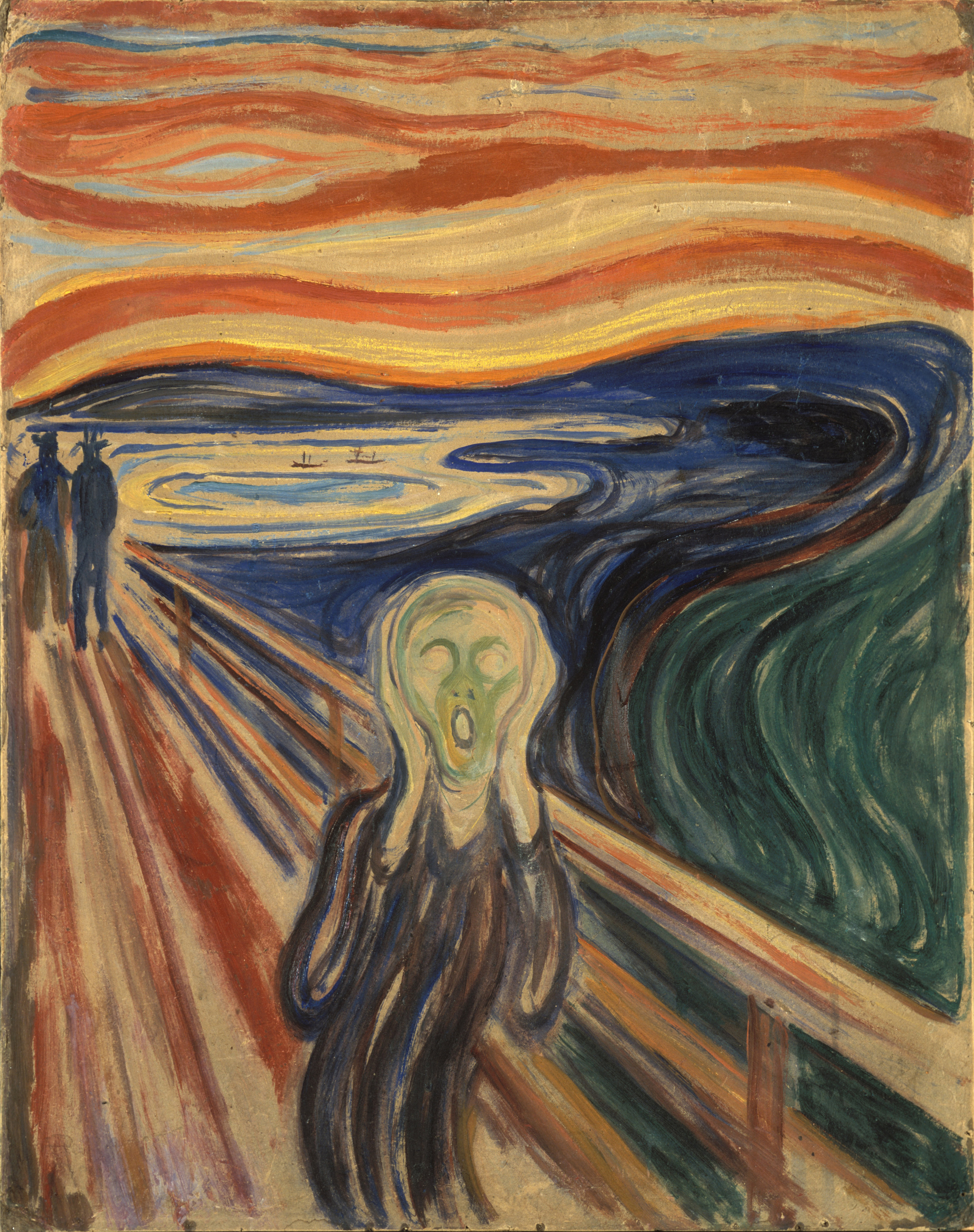
1910, tempera on cardboard. This version was stolen from the Munch Museum in 2004 but recovered in 2006.

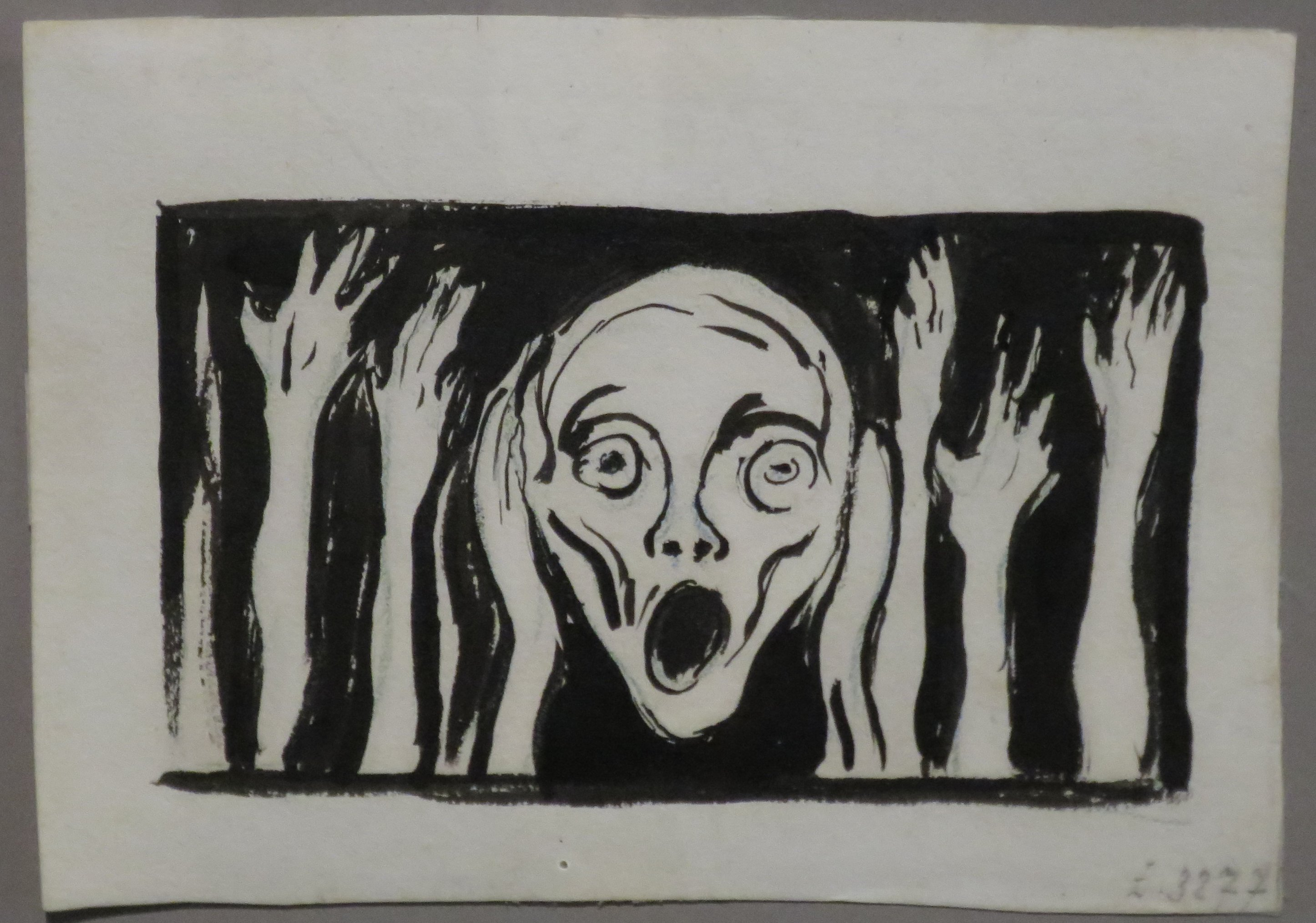
Undated, ink drawing. This composition, which features the central figure from The Scream, is in the collection of the University Museum of Bergen.

== See also ==
- List of paintings by Edvard Munch
