= Pål Enger =

Norwegian footballer and art thief (1967–2024)

- Born: 26 March 1967; Oslo, Norway
- Died: 29 June 2024 (aged 57)
- Occupation(s): Football player Art thief Painter
- Years active: 1977–2024
- Known for: Theft of The Scream and Love and Pain

Pål Enger (26 March 1967 – 29 June 2024) was a Norwegian art thief who was best known for stealing the paintings The Scream and Love and Pain by Edvard Munch. In his early life, he played football for Vålerenga Fotball.

== Early life and football ==
Growing up, Enger was part of the core of the criminal Tveita gang led by the money collector Jan Kvalen, which led to a sentence of one year for profiteering as a 16-year-old. When he was 19, he served his first sentence at Ullersmo prison.

In his teenage years, Enger was a promising footballer for Vålerenga Fotball. When he was 19, he played three matches as a substitute for Vålerenga's first team: twice in the Norwegian first division, and once in the UEFA Cup. After serving three years in prison for the theft of Love and Pain, Enger tried to take up football again in 1991, playing for Mercantile in the third tier of Norwegian football.

== Art thefts ==
On 23 February 1988, Enger climbed into a window at the Munch Museum in Oslo and stole the painting Love and Pain by Edvard Munch. In the same year, he was behind the biggest theft of its kind when he broke into the jeweller's shop Tostrup on Karl Johans gate and stole goods worth NOK 4.8 million. On 12 February 1994, he stole The Scream by Edvard Munch from the National Gallery.

He was also convicted of a number of other profiteering, traffic and drug offences, after a number of traffic offences.

In December 2015, Enger was charged with stealing a total of 17 paintings from the Fineart gallery at Aker brygge in Oslo. Twelve of the pictures were made by Hariton Pushwagner, the other artworks are made by Vebjørn Sand and Bjarne Melgaard. According to Dagbladet, a wallet with Enger's ID was found in the gallery. Enger pleaded partially guilty and admitted stealing five Pushwagner pictures.

Enger started painting during a prison stay in 2007, first animals and vehicles, and then abstract motifs. In March 2011, he opened his own art exhibition with a number of abstract works.

In a 2012 interview, Enger claimed that the painting The Scream had become world-famous because of him.

Enger died on 29 June 2024, at the age of 57.
