= Hugo Simon (art collector) =

German Jewish banker, art collector and refugee from Nazis (1880–1950)

Prussian Minister of Finance
- In office November 14, 1918 – January 4, 1919 Serving with Albert Südekum
- Preceded by: Oskar Hergt
- Succeeded by: Albert Südekum

Personal details
- Born: 1 September 1880 Usch, Posen Province
- Died: 1 July 1950 (aged 69) São Paulo, Brazil
- Party: USPD
- Occupation: Banker, art collector
- Known for: Owned Edvard Munch’s The Scream before the rise of the Nazis; patron of the arts

Hugo Simon 1 September 1880 – 1 July 1950) was a German Jewish banker, politician and art collector who was persecuted by the Nazis. He was a former owner of Edvard Munch's famous painting, The Scream. After the November Revolution of 1918, he was briefly Minister of Finance in the Prussian Council of People's Representatives as a member of the USPD. Alfred Döblin dealt with this short time as a politician in his novel November 1918.

== Early life ==
Hugo Simon came from a Jewish family. His father was the teacher Victor Simon, his mother was Sophie Simon (née Jablonski). He grew up on his father's farm in Kahlstädt in the Kolmar district (Posen province) and completed an agricultural training course and an apprenticeship in a bank in Marburg. After his father's death and the sale of the property, Simon lived with his wife Gertrud and their daughters Anette and Ursula in Berlin-Zehlendorf. In 1911 Simon founded the private bank Carsch Simon & Co. together with Otto Carsch. In 1922 the partners separated and Simon founded the successor company Bett Simon & Co. together with Kasimir Bett and Kurt Gutmacher.

Simon was chairman of the supervisory board of Allgemeine Häuserbau-AG from 1872 - Adolf Sommerfeld (Berlin), deputy chairman of the supervisory board of Cröllwitzer Actien-Papierfabrik (Halle ad Saale), member of the supervisory board of G. Feibisch AG (Berlin), steam brickworks Bergenhorst AG (Berlin), the Deutsche Grundkreditbank AG (Gotha-Berlin), R. Frister AG (Berlin-Oberschöneweide), Multiplex-Gasfernünder GmbH (Berlin), Terrain-AG Botanischer Garten - Zehlendorf West (Berlin), Thüringische Landeshypothekenbank AG (Weimar) and the Wurzen art mills and biscuit factories vorm. F. Krietsch (Wurzen) (all as of 1931).

Simon was a well-known art lover, collector and patron. He was a member of the purchasing committee of the Nationalgalerie Berlin. He was a member of the supervisory board of S. Fischer Verlag and Ullstein Verlag and banker of the publisher Paul Cassirer. Politicians, artists, scientists and scholars met every week in his house. These included Bertolt Brecht, Erich Maria Remarque, Alfred Döblin, Arnold Zweig, Heinrich Mann, Stefan Zweig and Carl Zuckmayer, also visual artists such as Max Pechstein, Oskar Kokoschka and George Grosz, also the actress Tilla Durieux, the publishers Samuel Fischer, Ernst Rowohlt and the Ullstein brothers and politicians like the Prussian Prime Minister Otto Braun. In addition, Hugo Simon was friends among others. with Albert Einstein, Karl Kautsky and Thomas Mann. The poet Else Lasker-Schüler dedicated her poem Gott hör ... to “Hugo Simon dem Boas” in 1920.

In 1921 Hugo Simon bought the former “Schweizerhaus” restaurant in Seelow (Brandenburg) and built a model farm there with cattle, poultry, fruit and vegetable cultivation. In 1923/24 he had a replica of Goethe's garden house built on the site in Weimar. The builder was the architect Ernst Rossius-Rhyn. There was also a small park with aviaries for different species of parakeets and pheasants and a bird fountain designed by the ceramicist Emil Pottner. He was a member of the Kaiser Wilhelm Society and worked among other things. together with Erwin Baur, director at the institute for breeding run by the Kaiser Wilhelm Society ungsforschung in Müncheberg.

== Nazi persecution ==
Immediately after the National Socialists came to power in 1933, Hugo Simon and his wife fled to Paris via Switzerland. He founded a bank again, supported refugee aid and got involved politically, among other things. as a founding member of the pacifist organization Bund Neues Vaterland (later renamed Deutsche Liga für Menschenrechte (German League for Human Rights)) . Shortly before the occupation of Paris by the Wehrmacht, he and his wife managed to escape to Marseille in June 1940. Finally, in February 1941, both were able to travel to Brazil via Spain and Portugal with Czech passports under the code names "Hubert Studenic" and "Garina Studenic".

The couple initially lived in Rio de Janeiro, then moved to Barbacena, where Hugo Simon devoted himself to raising silkworms. He died in São Paulo in 1950.

== Art collection ==
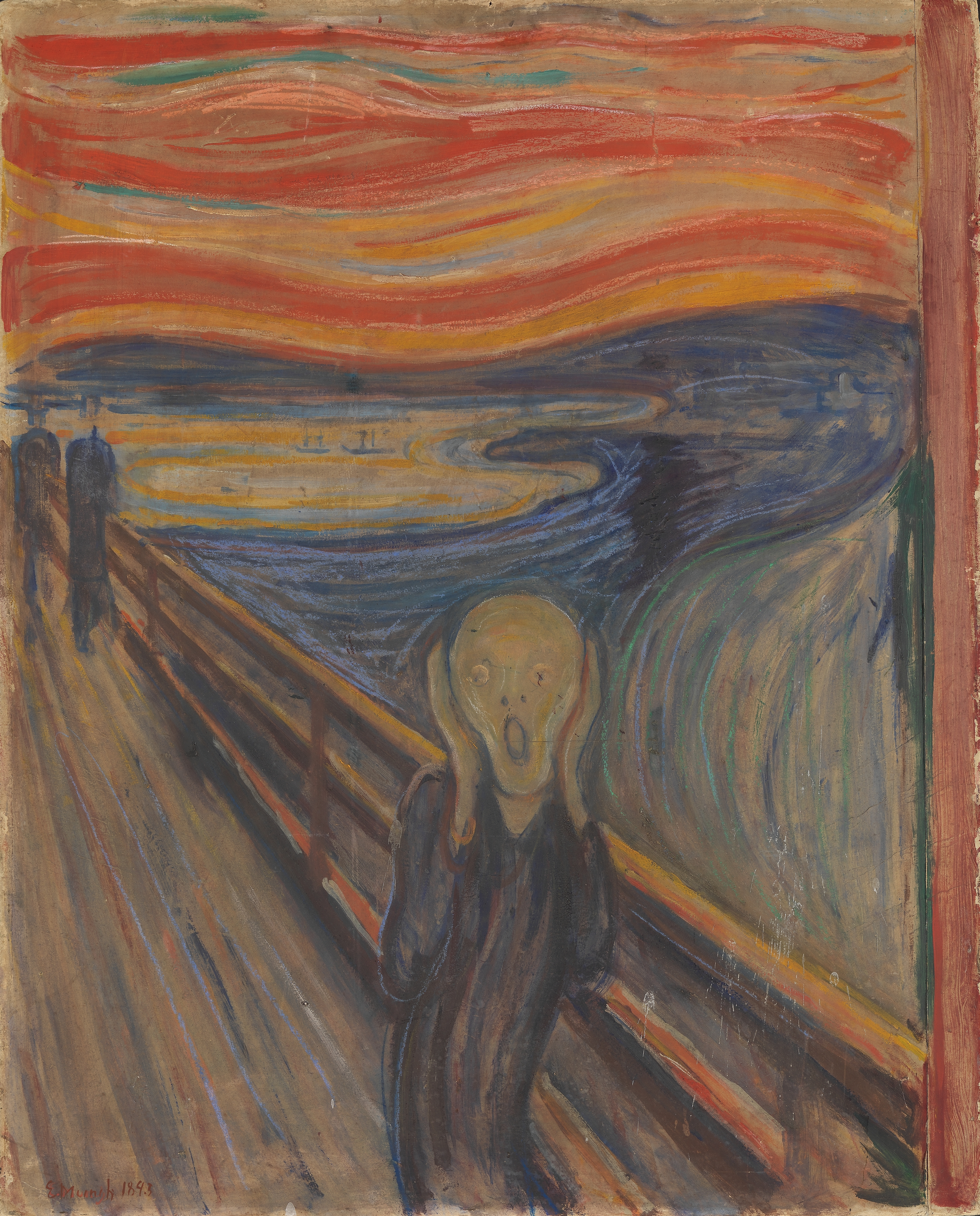
The Scream by Edvard Munch, 1893

Simon's extensive art collection was one of the most important in Berlin. Gathered between 1910 and 1933 it contained about 150 artworks. Nazi plunder, duress sales and flight as a refugee dispersed the collection. Artworks remaining in Germany were seized by the Nazis on 9 October 1933, with Simon's other property. Some of Simon's collection ended up in Switzerland in the Kunsthaus Zürich and the Kunstmuseum Basel. Edvard Munch's famous painting The Scream ended up in Norway in the Henie Onstad Kunstsenter.

== Schweizerhaus ==
The Schweizerhaus was opened on 5 October 1933 by an order of the District President in Frankfurt a. d. Or (Rapporteur: Government Councilor Möbius) drafted. Nazis justified the confiscation claiming that Simon was finance minister of the “Marxist Prussian government” and a member of the USPD “ -The Schweizerhaus was taken over in 1936 by the state experimental institute in Landsberg / Warthe and continued as the “Staatliches Versuchsgut Oderbruch”. After the Second World War, the estate was first occupied by the Soviet Red Army and then, in 1950, taken over by the Association of Nationally Owned Enterprises and operated as VEB Gartenbau.

After 1990 a community of heirs applied for restitution. In 2010 the city of Seelow bought the area and the Heimatverein “Schweizerhaus Seelow” e.V. renovated the building.

== Nazi-looted art ==
Hugo Simon submitted restitution claims for art plundered by the Nazis starting in 1947. After his death, his heirs continued the process of trying to locate and recover artworks from his collection, notably Munch's The Scream which Simon consigned to a Swiss gallery in 1937 as he fled the Nazis.

In 2021, following the French government's restitution of Max Pechstein's Nus dans un paysage (1912), the Centre Pompidou in Paris held an exhibition in honor of Hugo Simon.

== Autobiography ==
- Hugo Simon: Seidenraupen. (unveröffentlicht).

== Literature ==
- Robert Volz: Reichshandbuch der deutschen Gesellschaft. Das Handbuch der Persönlichkeiten in Wort und Bild. Band 2: L–Z. Deutscher Wirtschaftsverlag, Berlin 1931, DNB-IDN 453960294, S. 1787.
- Dok. 118. Der Regierungspräsident in Frankfurt (Oder) rechtfertigt gegenüber dem preußischen Finanzminister am 26. Mai 1934 die Einziehung des Gutes von Hugo Simon. In: Die Verfolgung und Ermordung der europäischen Juden durch das nationalsozialistische Deutschland 1933–1945. Band 1: 1933–1937. Oldenbourg-Wissenschaftsverlag, 2007, S. 339–341 (Leseprobe, books.google.de) – zur Enteignung des Schweizerhauses.
- Marlen Eckl: „Das Paradies ist überall verloren“. Das Brasilienbild von Flüchtlingen des Nationalsozialismus. Vervuert, Frankfurt am Main 2010, ISBN 978-3-86527-579-0.
- Felix Escher (2010). "Simon, Hugo". Neue Deutsche Biographie (in German). Vol. 24. Berlin: Duncker & Humblot. pp. 435–436. (full text online).
- Izabela Maria Furtado Kestler: Die Exilliteratur und das Exil der deutschsprachigen Schriftsteller und Publizisten in Brasilien. Frankfurt am Main 1992.
- Edita Koch: Hugo Simon/Hubert Studenic. In: Exil. [Frankfurt, M.], Band 3, 1983, 1, S. 50 f. ISSN 0721-6742.
- Frithjof Trapp: Die Autobiographie des Bankiers und Politikers Hugo Simon: politische Reflexion im Medium des deutschen Realismus. In: Exil. [Frankfurt am Main], Bd. 6 (1986), 2, S. 30–38, ISSN 0721-6742.
- Unabhängige Expertenkommission Schweiz – Zweiter Weltkrieg (Hrsg.): Fluchtgut – Raubgut. Der Transfer von Kulturgütern in und über die Schweiz 1933–1945 und die Frage der Restitution. Zürich 2001.
- Anna-Dorothea Ludewig, Rafael Cardoso (Hrsg.): Hugo Simon in Berlin. Handlungsorte und Denkräume. Hentrich & Hentrich, Berlin / Leipzig 2018, ISBN 978-3-95565-274-6.
- Nina Senger, Jan Maruhn: Hugo Simon. Bankier, Sammler, Sozialist. (Biographie) Mit einem Vorwort von Rafael Cardoso. Nimbus, Berlin 2020, ISBN 978-3-03850-057-5.
- Privatfilm für Hugo Simon (1924), Regie und Produktion: Gertrud David.

== See also ==
- Einsatzstab Reichsleiter Rosenberg
- List of claims for restitution for Nazi-looted art
- MNR

== Links ==
- Literature by and about Hugo Simon (art collector) in the German National Library catalogue
- Teilnachlass Hugo Simon im Deutschen Exilarchiv der Deutschen Nationalbibliothek
