= Dmitry Yakovlevsky =

Russian footballer (born 1988)

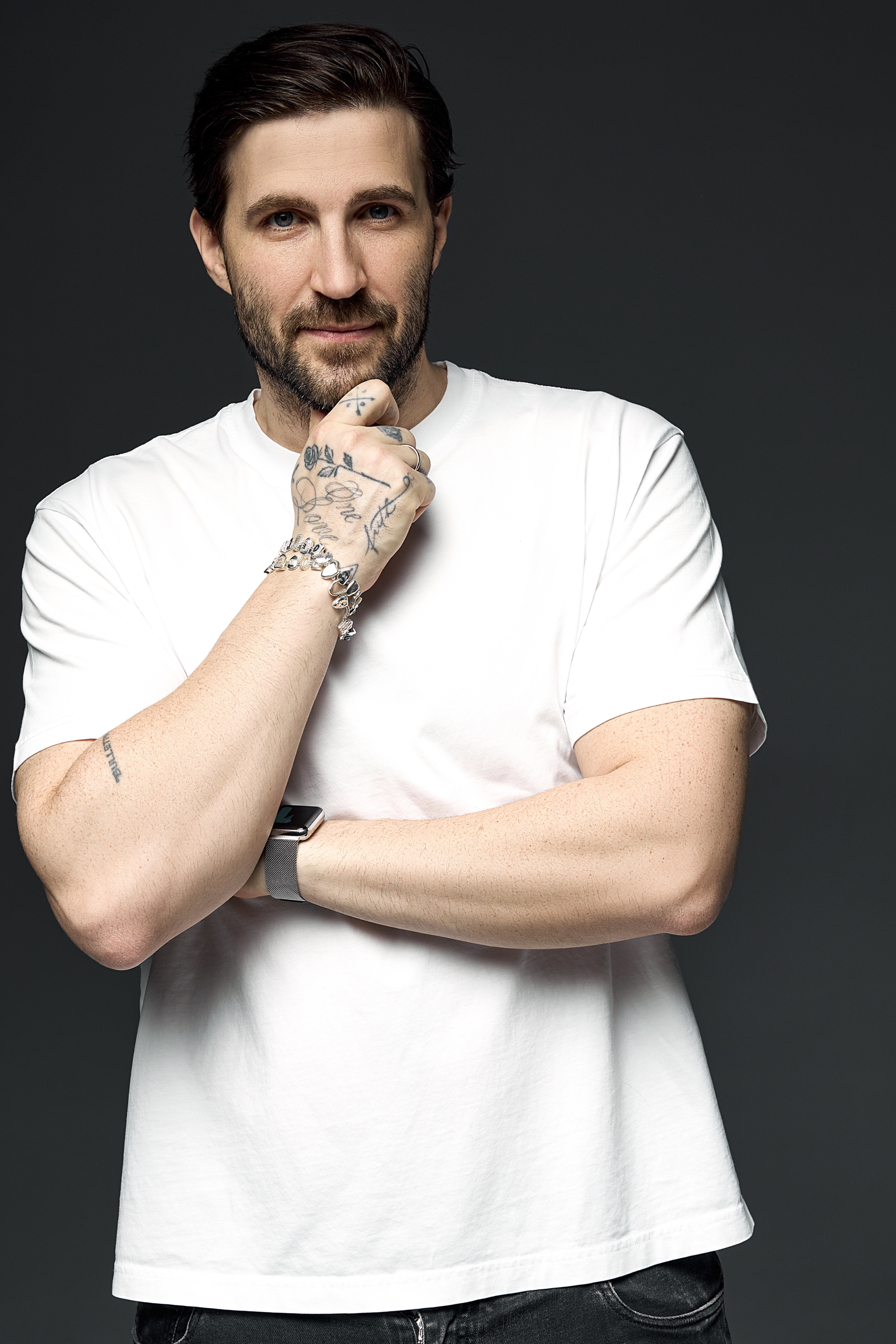

Personal information
- Full name: Dmitry Aleksandrovich Yakovlevsky
- Date of birth: 9 May 1988 (age 38)
- Place of birth: Moscow, USSR
- Height: 1.90 m (6 ft 3 in)
- Position: Forward

Youth career
- Germinal Beerschot
- –2006: Red Star Waasland
- 2007: Hellas Verona

Senior career*
Years	Team	Apps	(Gls)
2007–2008	Hellas Verona	2	(0)
2008	Eendracht Aalst	0	(0)
2009	AGOVV Apeldoorn	1	(0)
2009	Vityaz	1	(0)
2010–2011	RFC Liège	28	(9)
2011–2012	Deinze	27	(10)
2012–2013	K.S.V. Temse	17	(4)
2013–2014	FC Pepingen		
2014–2016	Rapide Club Lebbeke		
2016–2017	KVK Svelta Melsele		

International career
2006	Russia U-18	11	(4)
- * Club domestic league appearances and goals

Dmitry Aleksandrovich Yakovlevsky (Russian: Дмитрий Александрович Яковлевский; born 9 May 1988) is a Russian former football forward and creative director of the design studio "TwentyFive".

== Career ==
Dmitry Yakovlevsky with his parents moved from Moscow to Antwerp, Belgium at the age of three and obtain Belgian citizenship.

He played for several youth teams, including Belgian Germinal Beerschot and Red Star Waasland as well as Italian Hellas Verona. He signed for Hellas Verona in January 2007 and made his professional debut for them in Italian Serie C1/A in 2007–2008 season.

In February 2009 Yakovlevsky signed for AGOVV Apeldoorn of Dutch Eerste Divisie after a successful trial. He returned to Russia and signed for First Division team Vityaz Podolsk during the 2009 season summer transfer window. He was released after the end of season and has since returned to Belgium to play for R.F.C. de Liège and K.M.S.K. Deinze, both of Belgian Third Division.

In 2019 he founded his own design studio "Yakovlevsky Studio", which develops and organizes unique events, installations, shows and concerts. The studio specializes in the integration of cutting-edge technologies, including holography and multimedia design, creating innovative and immersive experiences. The studio organized concerts for such artists as Dima Bilan, Eldzhey, shot a video for Morgenstern and produced various events.

In 2025, the studio was rebranded as TwentyFive.
