= Elijah Aboab Cardoso =

Jewish philanthropist

Elijah Aboab Cardoso was a philanthropist and founder of the Hamburg synagogue. He lived in that city in the first half of the seventeenth century. He was descended from the Spanish - originally Portuguese - Cardoso family, and was one of the first Jewish settlers in Hamburg.

In 1630 Cardoso founded the first Portuguese synagogue in the city. In so doing he risked the displeasure of the Senate of Hamburg, which did not care to grant the Jews permission to build a synagogue, lest the attention of the fanatical population of Hamburg should be attracted to them.
