= Richard Neumann =

Austrian businessman and art collector

Richard Neumann (born December 17, 1879, in Vienna, died 1961 in New York) was an Austrian industrialist and art collector persecuted by Nazis because he was Jewish.

== Early life ==
Richard Neumann was born into a Jewish family who had made their fortune with textiles. His grandfather Max Bernhard Neumann founded the M. B. Neumann company in Königinhof and was one of the leading textile producers in the Danube Monarchy.

Richard Neumann studied in Heidelberg and received his doctorate there. phil. In 1901 he joined the family business. In 1923 he became president of the M. B. Neumanns Sons Union and vice-president of the Neumanns Sons Austrian weaving and printing company A.G. (Neumanns Söhne Österreichische Weberei und Druckerei A.G). He also became director of the Guntramsdorfer Stoffedruckfabrik and was on the board of several other textile companies.

== Art Collection ==
In 1921, Neumann's art collection was honored with landmark status in Austria; 28 of the over 200 works were acknowledged as particularly important. Neumann and his wife Alice agreed in a notarial act that the collection could be viewed twelve days of the year - either as part of state organized exhibitions, or by legitimate visitors monument office. In return, the couple received deductions on his property tax.

== Nazi persecution ==
After the Anschluss with Nazi Germany in 1938, the Neumanns were persecuted because of their Jewish origins. Neumann's villa at 30 Hasenauerstraße in Vienna was "Aryanized", i.e. transferred to a non-Jewish person. It became the property of Daisy Princess Fürstenberg. Neumann's art collection was inventoried by the Nazis and seized through forced sales and refused export licenses. He was forced to pay special taxes imposed on Jews.

Neumann fled to Paris and then to Cuba with his wife Alice.

Neumann found work in a textile factory in Cuba, gave evening lectures on art history and became an honorary professor at the University of Havana. He was one of the initiators of the founding of the Palacio de Bellas Artes in Havana. He later moved to the United States.

== Restitution of artworks from the Neumann Collection ==
From 1949 at the latest, Neumann tried, through his lawyer Felix Friedländer, to recover some of the artworks. In 1952 he traveled to Vienna to discuss the issue with the Kunsthistorisches Museum in Vienna which held pieces from his collection.

In 2007 the descendants of Neumann received back two paintings by "Kremser Schmidt" Martin Johann Schmidt, which had come into the possession of the city of Krems an der Donau illegally through the "Aryanization". The family's lawyer and provenance researcher Sophie Lillie had been trying to get it returned since 2002. In 2012 at least one of the two paintings, St. Florian saves the burning Stockern Castle, was offered at auction but failed to meet the reserve. The two very large altarpieces were ultimately sold to a museum in Lower Austria.

In 2010, Neumann's heirs received back Two altar wings with pictures of the donors by Martin van Heemskerck, a sacrificial scene, Hannibal's oath by Giovanni Battista Pittoni, the painting Laundresses by Alessandro Magnasco and two statuettes by Alessandro Algardi depicting Pope Innocent X and St. Pius.

When the Allies seized objects looted by Nazis from the former Neumann Collection after the end of the Second World War, they returned them not to the Neumann family but to France. The looted art ended up in various French museums. The "Musées Nationaux Récupération" (MNR) placed three paintings - The Miracle of Saint Eligius by Gaetano Gandolfi, Abraham and the three angels by Sebastiano Ricci and a portrait of Saint Francis of Paola standing in a niche by Salvador Francesco Fontebasso - in the Louvre and three other items were given to museums in Agen, Saint-Étienne and Tours. These six pieces from the Neumann collection were identified by the art historian and provenance researcher Sophie Lillie after the MNR holdings were published online. The restitution of these six works of art was the most extensive restitution to date since the founding of the Commission pour l'indemnisation des victimes de spoliations (CIVS).

In 2021, the Worcester Art Museum organized an exhibition from April 10, 2021, to January 16, 2022, about the looting of the Neumann collection entitled What the Nazis Stole from Richard Neumann (and the search to get it back). "The exhibition includes 12 Old Master paintings and two sculptures and will trace his and his family's efforts to reclaim these works over the last 70 years."

== See also ==
- Aryanization
- The Holocaust in Austria
- Anschluss
- List of claims for restitution for Nazi-looted art
- Musées nationaux récupération
