= Marcel (footballer, born 1983) =

Brazilian footballer

Personal information
- Full name: Marcel Silva Cardoso
- Date of birth: May 31, 1983 (age 43)
- Place of birth: Uberlândia, Brazil
- Height: 1.93 m (6 ft 4 in)
- Position: Left back

Team information
- Current team: Uberaba

Senior career*
Years	Team	Apps	(Gls)
2006–2007	Villa Nova-MG		
2007–2008	Atlético Mineiro		
2007–2008	→ CRB (Loan)		
2008–2010	Vila Nova		
2010	Uberaba	7	(1)
2011	Atlético Sorocaba		
2011	América-RN	4	(0)
2012–	Uberaba		
- * Club domestic league appearances and goals

Marcel Silva Cardoso or simply Marcel (born May 31, 1983 in Uberlândia), is a Brazilian left back, he currently plays for Uberaba Sport Club.

== Contract ==
- Vila Nova May 2, 2008 to 30 November 2008
