= Vanderlan Cardoso =

Brazilian businessman and politician

Senator for Goiás
- Incumbent
- Assumed office February 1, 2019

Mayor of Senador Canedo
- In office January 1, 2005 – March 31, 2010
- Vice Mayor: Túlio Coelho
- Preceded by: Divino Lemes
- Succeeded by: Túlio Coelho

Personal details
- Born: Vanderlan Vieira Cardoso; November 15, 1962 (age 63) Iporá, Brazil
- Party: PSD (2020–present)
- Other political affiliations: PL (2003–06); PR (2006–11); PMDB (2011–12); PSB (2013–18); PP (2018–20)
- Spouse: Izaura Cardoso
- Children: 2
- Profession: Businessman

Vanderlan Vieira Cardoso (born November 15, 1962) is a Brazilian businessman and politician. He was mayor of Senador Canedo (2005–2010). Cardoso ran the government of Goiás in 2010 and 2014 and mayor of Goiânia in 2016. Was defeated by Iris Rezende (MDB) in the second round.

In 2018 he was elected senator of Brazil by Goiás in the legend Progressive Party (PP) and now is member of Social Democratic Party (PSD).

Political offices
Preceded by Divino Lemes	Mayor of Senador Canedo; 2005–10	Succeeded by Túlio Coelho
