= Carlos Cardoso =

Carlos Cardoso may refer to:

- Carlos Cardoso (journalist) (1951–2000), Mozambican journalist murdered in 2000
- Carlos Cardoso (footballer) (1944–2025), Portuguese football manager
- Carlos Alexandre Cardoso (born 1984), Brazilian football defender
- Carlos M. Cardoso, American businessman
