= Rafael Cardoso (art historian) =

Brazilian writer and art historian

- Born: June 4, 1964 (age 62); Rio de Janeiro, Brazil

Rafael Cardoso (born 4 June 1964) is a Brazilian art historian and writer. His published work includes numerous books and essays on the history of art and design in Brazil, nineteenth and twentieth centuries. He has also published four works of fiction, including Entre as Mulheres (2007) which first brought him to the attention of an international audience, particularly after its translation into German as Sechzehn Frauen (2013). His novel, O Remanescente (2016) was published simultaneously in Brazil, by Companhia das Letras, and Germany, by S. Fischer.

== Early life and education ==
Rafael Cardoso Denis was born in Rio de Janeiro to a mixed cultural background. His father was a physician, born in France of Jewish German parents and immigrated to Brazil during the Second World War. His mother comes from a well-known literary family in Minas Gerais, being the niece of renowned Brazilian writer Lúcio Cardoso, author of Crônica de Casa Assassinada (1959), and Maria Helena Cardoso, also a noted writer. When Cardoso was five, his parents moved to the United States, and he was brought up mainly in Virginia. He attended college at the Johns Hopkins University, in Baltimore, from which he graduated Phi Beta Kappa in 1985. He returned to Brazil shortly thereafter and obtained an MA in art history from the Universidade Federal do Rio de Janeiro, going on to do a PhD in art history at the Courtauld Institute of Art, in London, from 1991 to 1995.

== Career ==
Cardoso's first books of fiction and non-fiction appeared in 2000, and he has continually published both, since then. His first notable success was the design history textbook Uma Introdução à História do Design, now in its third edition and widely used in Brazilian universities. He is well established as a historian of art and design in Brazil, having authored over a dozen books and hundreds of essays and articles, as well as editing and translating works by John Ruskin and Vilém Flusser. In 2018, his book A arte brasileira em 25 quadros was made into a six-part series for Brazilian television channel Arte 1. A second season of the series screened in January 2026, also on Arte1. His 2021 book Modernity in Black and White has been acclaimed as a groundbreaking account of modern art and modernism in Brazil. It was awarded the 2021 Roberto Reis book award by the Brazilian Studies Association BRASA.

With O Remanescente, Cardoso brought his fiction and non-fiction writing together for the first time. The book is a historical novel, based on true facts, and tells the story of his father's family's flight from Germany in the 1930s, their exile in France and eventual refuge in Brazil. The main character is the author's great-grandfather, Hugo Simon, a banker, socialist politician and art collector in Berlin, during the Weimar Republic, where he was a prominent cultural figure and briefly Minister of Finance of Prussia after the German Revolution of 1918-19. In 2021, Cardoso helped create the Hugo Simon Foundation, based in Seelow, Brandenburg, and currently serves as chair of its advisory board.

Cardoso pursued a full-time academic career from 1996 to 2012, working successively as a professor at Pontifícia Universidade Católica do Rio de Janeiro and Universidade do Estado do Rio de Janeiro, where he continues to serve as a member of the postgraduate faculty in art history. He has also held temporary teaching or research positions at Freie Universität Berlin, Universität Hamburg, Getty Research Institute, Institut national d'histoire de l'art and Yale University. He is a member of Deutscher Verband für Kunstgeschichte, PEN Berlin, and the German section of Association Internationale des Critiques d'Art. Between 2020 and 2023, he served as chair of AICA International's committee on censorship and freedom of expression. In 2024, he held the Aby Warburg Guest Professorship at Warburg Haus, Hamburg.

Cardoso is also known for his work as a curator, having staged exhibitions of Brazilian art, both historical and contemporary. Among the major exhibitions he curated are: O olhar germânico na gênese do Brasil (Museu Imperial, Petrópolis, 2022), Do Valongo à Favela: Imaginário e Periferia (Museu de Arte do Rio, 2014), Rio de Imagens: uma Paisagem em Construção (Museu de Arte do Rio, 2013), From the Margin to the Edge: Brazilian Art and Design in the 21st Century (Somerset House, London, 2012) and Eliseu Visconti: a Modernidade Antecipada (Pinacoteca do Estado de São Paulo, 2011). He has also written song lyrics, including the 1988 hit Vamos Dançar for Ed Motta & Conexão Japeri, and is co-author of the screenplay for the feature-length film Maresia (2016), together with director Marcos Guttmann and screenwriter Melanie Dimantas. He writes for the Brazilian and international press.

== Bibliography ==
=== Fiction ===
• O Remanescente (2016) [German edition, Das Vermächtnis der Seidenraupen, S. Fischer Verlag, 2016; Dutch edition, De vlucht van de familie Simon, Nieuw Amsterdam, 2017; Portuguese edition, O Remanescente, Compasso dos Ventos, 2018] ISBN 9788535928136
• Entre as Mulheres (2007) [German edition, Sechzehn Frauen: Geschichten aus Rio, S. Fischer Verlag, 2013; Spanish edition, Dieciséis Mujeres, Alevosia, 2013] ISBN 9788501077011
• Controle Remoto (2002) ISBN 8501063185
• A Maneira Negra (2000) [Italian edition, Il falsario di Rio, Fabula, 2008] ISBN 8501057681

=== Non-Fiction ===
- Modernity in Black and White: Art and Image, Race and Identity in Brazil, 1890-1945 (2021) [Brazilian edition: Modernidade em preto e branco: Arte e imagem, raça e identidade no Brasil, 1890-1945 Companhia das Letras, 2022] ISBN 9781108481908
- Hugo Simon in Berlin: Handlungsorte und Denkräume (2018) [co-edited with Anna-Dorothea Ludewig, German edition] ISBN 9783955652746
- Do Valongo à Favela: Imaginário e periferia (2015) [co-edited with Clarissa Diniz] ISBN 9788568880012
- Design para um Mundo Complexo (2012) ISBN 9788540500983
- Impresso no Brasil, 1808-1930: Destaques da História Gráfica no Acervo da Biblioteca Nacional (2009) ISBN 9788562767005
- Marcas do Progresso: Consumo e Design no Brasil do Século XIX (2009) [co-authored w/ Cláudia Beatriz Heynemann & Maria do Carmo Teixeira Rainho] ISBN 9788560207220
- A Arte Brasileira em 25 Quadros (1790-1930) (2008) ISBN 9788501071736
- O Design Brasileiro antes do Design: Aspectos da História Gráfica, 1870-1960 (2005) ISBN 8575034286
- Uma Introdução à História do Design (2000) ISBN 9788521204565
- Art and the Academy in the Nineteenth Century (2000) [co-edited w/Colin Trodd] ISBN 0719054958
