= Musées nationaux récupération =

French state organisation that manages looted artworks

National Museum Recuperation (MNR or Musées nationaux récupération) is the French state organization that manages the looted artworks recovered from Nazi Germany and returned to France after the Second World War. Of 61,000 looted artworks returned to France, 2143 remain in custody of the MNR.

== History ==
After the defeat of Nazi Germany in World War II, 61,000 plundered artworks recovered by the Allied Monuments Men in Germany were returned to France which was responsible for restituting them to their original owners. 45,000 artworks were returned to their owners, while others were entrusted to the custody of the national museums. These artworks constitute what are called MNRs for Musées Nationaux Récuperation, ("National Museums Recuperation").

The acronym MNR refers to all these works, around 2000, but also constitutes the prefix of the inventory numbers of the only old paintings entrusted to the Department of Paintings of the Louvre (about half of all the works). Jewish art collectors in all countries occupied by Nazi Germany were targeted for looting. In France, Jews were plundered by the Nazi looting organisations known as the E.R.R. (Einsatzstab Reichsleiter Rosenberg) and M-Aktion, and well as by the French occupation authorities.

Artworks in the MNR are supposed to be researched and returned their legitimate owners if they can be located.

The 2131 MNR artworks, are kept at the Louvre, the Orsay Museum, the National Museum of Modern Art and in other museums throughout France. France has published an online database of MNR artworks at the Site Rose-Valland Musées Nationaux Récupération

== Seizures ==
From the beginning of the occupation, the German embassy in Paris, and its representative, Otto Abetz, under the pretext of "securing" art, organized major seizures of art collection. In September 1940, the responsibility for plundering artworks of Jewish art collectors shifted to the Nazi looting organisation known as the Einsatzstab Reichsleiter Rosenberg or Reichsleiter Rosenberg Taskforce or (ERR). In France, looted art was inventoried initially at the Louvre, then at the Jeu de Paume which was made available to the ERR in November 1940. Nazi war criminal Hermann Goering visited frequently to select artworks for his own personal collection.

After cataloguing, the confiscated objects left for the Louvre where they were crated before being shipped. Between April 1941 and July 1944, the ERR sent 138 wagons to Germany containing 4,174 cases, or about 22,000 lots.

== Inventories: MNR, OAR, REC ==
The decree of September 30, 1949 which puts an end to the Commission de récupération artistique (CRA) obliges the administration of museums to create a specific inventory on which will be registered the works selected by the selection commissions, then entrusted by the OBIP to the custody of the museums. The museums decide to inventory them under the acronym R of "recovery".

Les sigles des objets au Louvre sont :

- ER : Antiquités égyptiennes Récupération
- AGRR : Antiquités gréco-romaines Récupération
- AOR : Antiquités orientales Récupération
- REC : Récupération Arts graphiques anciens
- OAR : Objets d'art anciens Récupération
- MNR : Peintures anciennes et XIXe siècle Récupération
- RFR : Sculptures Récupération

Les sigles au Musée national d'art moderne sont :

- R n° P* : Récupération Peintures modernes
- R n° OA* : Récupération Objets d'art modernes
- R n° D* : Récupération Dessins modernes
- R n° S* : Récupération Sculptures modernes

In 2017, the Louvre museum dedicated two new rooms to present 31 paintings from artistic recovery (MNR) in addition to the 76 paintings presented in the permanent museum tour, accompanied by a specific mention indicating their origin.

Quelques tableaux MNR

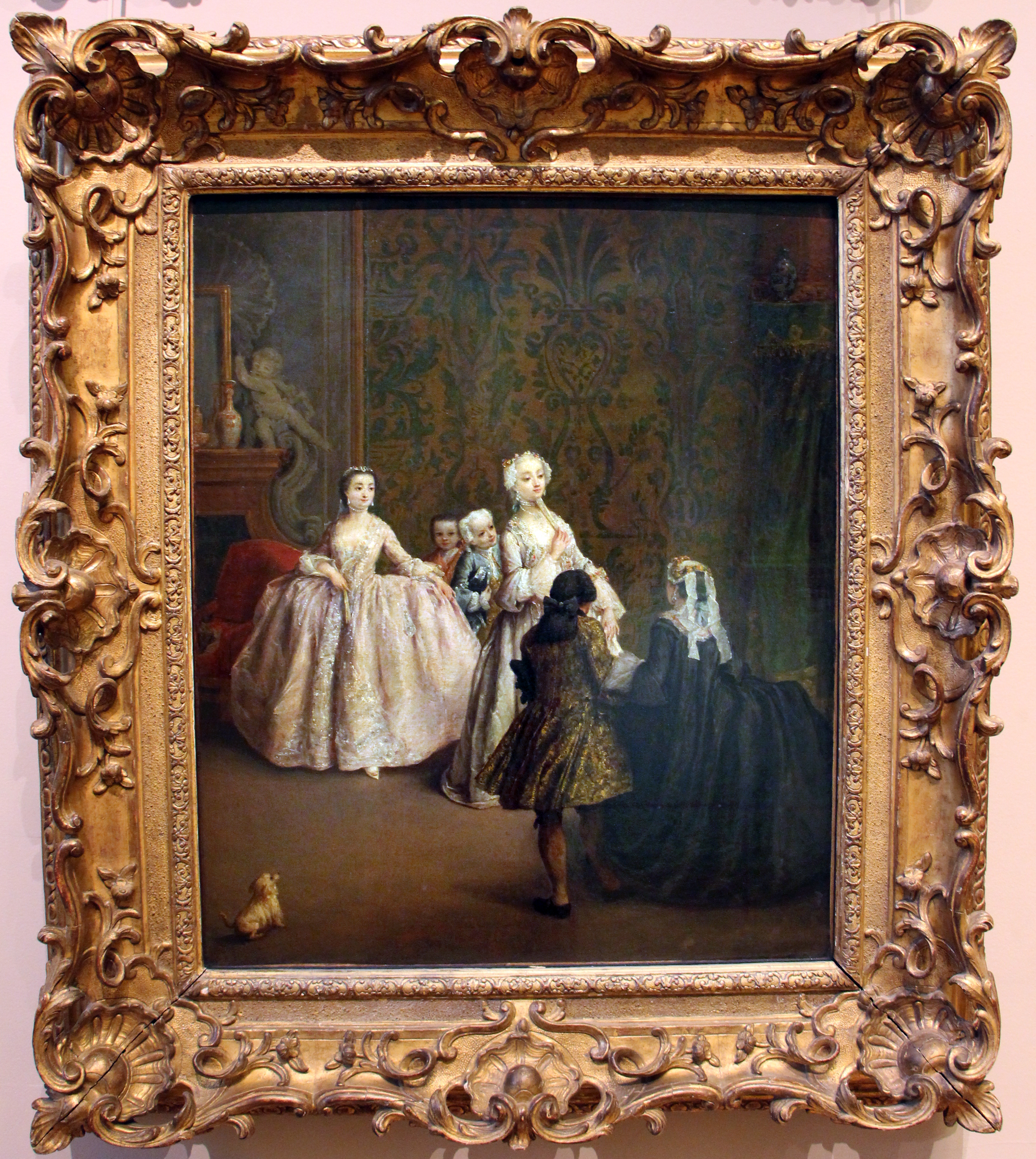
Pietro Longhi, Présentation, Louvre MNR 562

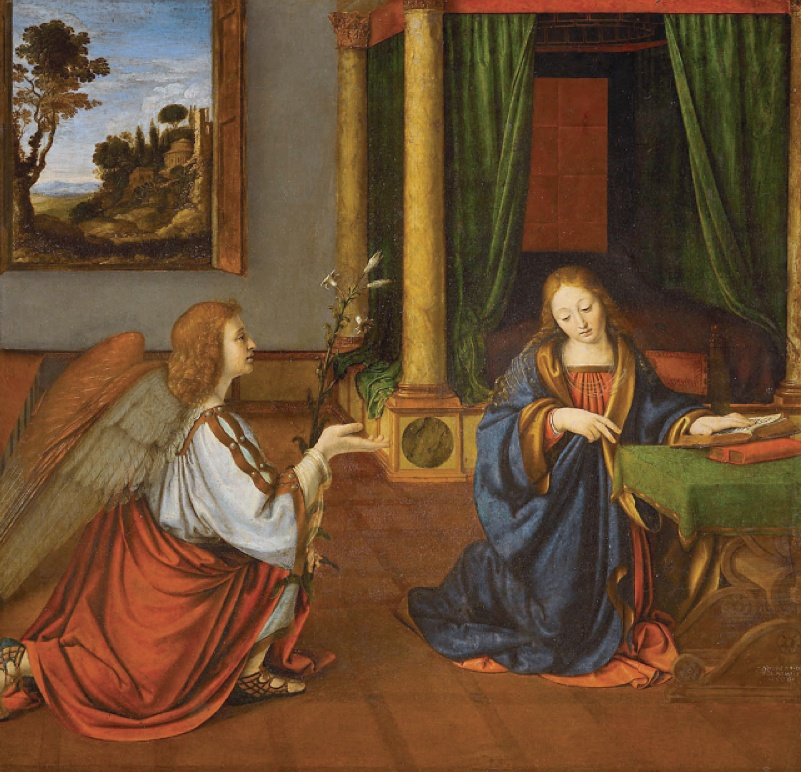
Andrea Solario, Annonciation, Louvre MNR 256

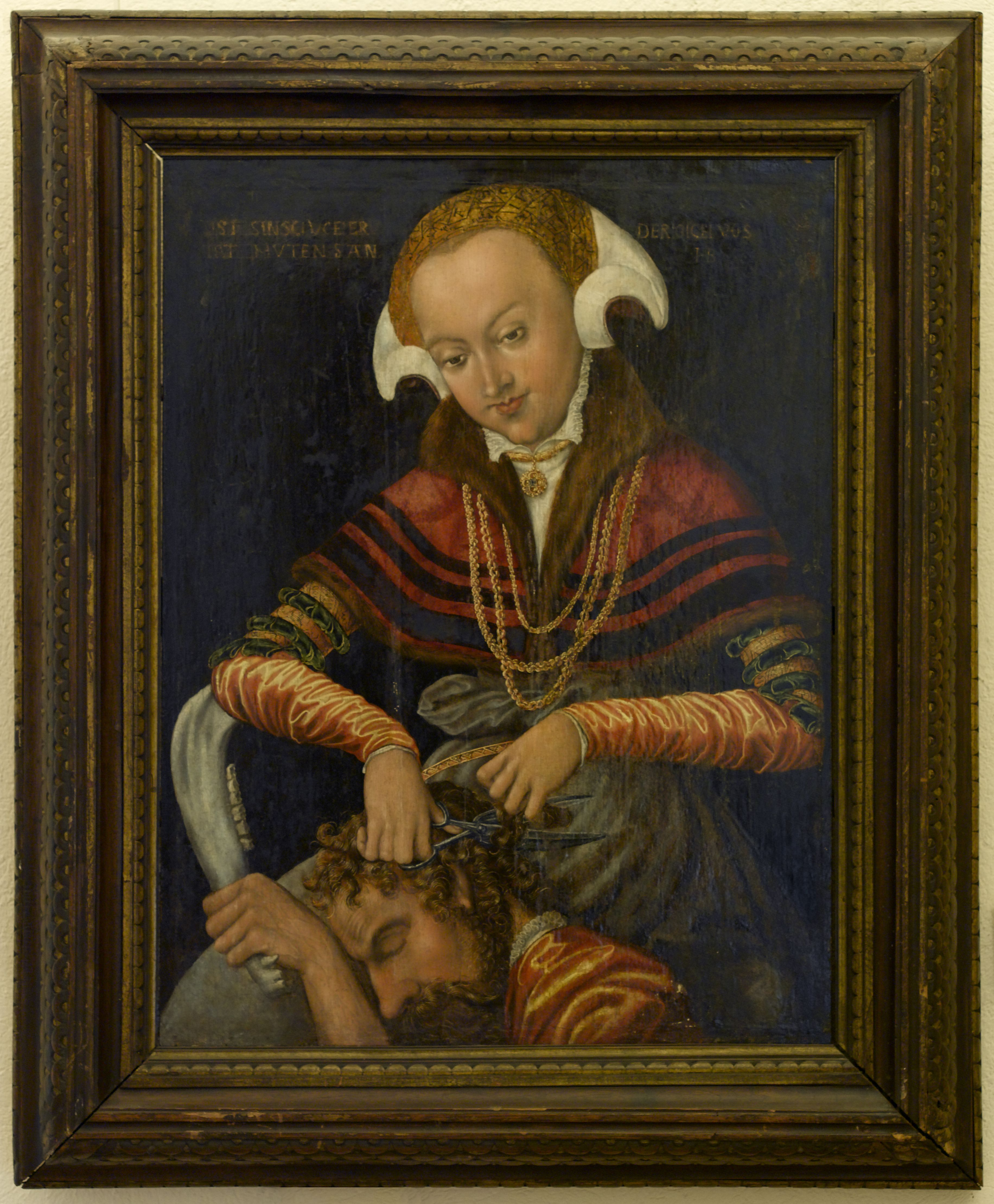
Dalila coupant les cheveux de Samson, Anne de Beaujeu Museum MNR 362

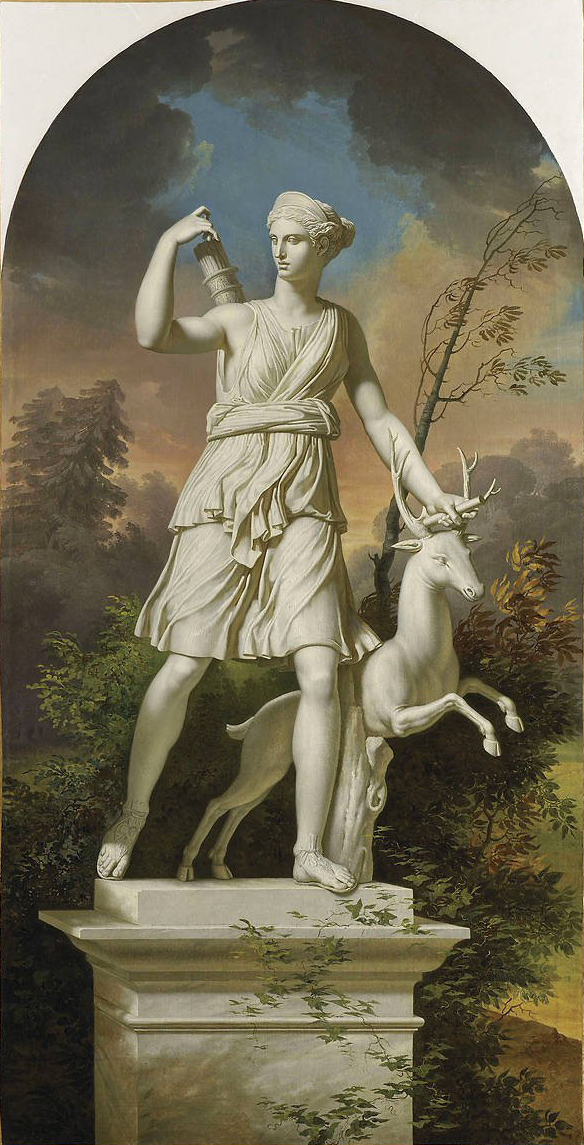
Dianne chasseresse, Musée de la Révolution française MNR 603

== Criticisms ==
Until the recent creation of public databases, the MNR, along with other institutions formally responsible for restituting looted artworks, were the object of criticisms for opacity and inefficiency.

== Recent restitutions ==
A few examples of restitutions include:

- The Louvre to the heirs of Richard Neumann
- The Louvre to the heirs of Armand Dorville
- Lucy Jonquet
- The Louvre and Musée d'Orsay to the heirs of Marguerite Stern
- 17th century Italian portrait of a woman "Simon Vouet" to the heirs of Gabrielle Philippson

== Bibliography ==
=== Books ===
- Mission d'étude sur la spoliation des juifs de France (2000). Le pillage de l'art en France pendant l'occupation et la situation des 2000 Œuvres confiées aux musées nationaux. Paris: La documentation française.
- Marie Hamon (1993). La récupération des œuvres d'art spoliées 1944-1993. Paris: Ministère des affaires étrangères-Direction des archives..
- James Joseph Rorimer (1950). Survival : the salvage and protection of art in war. New York: Abelard Press. p. 291..
- Rose Valland (1997). Le Front de l'art. Paris York: RMN..
- Corinne Bouchoux (2006). Rose Valland. Résistance au musée (in French). La Crèche: Geste. p. 134. ISBN 2-84561-236-2..
- Robert M. Edsel (2010). Monuments men. Paris: J.-C. Lattès..
- Ophélie Jouan (2019). Rose Valland. Grenoble: Musée de la Résistance et de la Déportation de l'Isère, Maison des Droits de l'Homme..

=== For children ===
- Catel; Emmanuelle Polack; Claire Bouilhac (2006). Rose Valland, capitaine Beaux-Arts. Paris: Dupuis. ISBN 2-8001-4552-8..
- Emmanuelle Polack; Emmanuel Cerisier (2009). Rose Valland, l'espionne du musée du Jeu de Paume. Saint-Herblain: Gulf Stream..

=== Films ===
- John Frankenheimer, Le Train, 1964
- George Clooney, Monuments Men, 2014

== See also ==
- List of claims for restitution for Nazi-looted art
- German Occupation of France
- Holocaust in France
- Einsatzstab Reichsleiter Rosenberg
- Rose Valland
