= Izaura Cardoso =

Brazilian politician

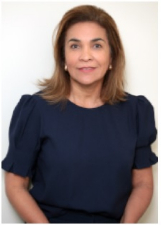

Personal details
- Born: Izaura Cristina Cantanhede Peres Cardoso; 2 December 1968 (age 57) Boa Vista, Roraima, Brazil
- Party: Liberal Party (PL) (until 2024); Social Democratic Party (PSD) (2024–present)
- Spouse: Vanderlan Cardoso
- Occupation: Politician

Izaura Cristina Cantanhede Peres Cardoso (born 2 December 1968) is a Brazilian politician who served as first lady of Senador Canedo, in the state of Goiás. She was elected first substitute senator for Wilder Morais in the 2022 Brazilian general election as a member of the Liberal Party (PL).

She is married to senator Vanderlan Cardoso, president of the Social Democratic Party (PSD) in Goiás and former mayor of Senador Canedo.

== Early life ==
Izaura Cardoso was born in Boa Vista, capital of Roraima, on 2 December 1968.

She gained political prominence in Goiás during the administrations of her husband, Vanderlan Cardoso, as mayor of Senador Canedo between 2005 and 2010.

Over the years, she became involved in political articulations and electoral campaigns linked to the political group led by Vanderlan Cardoso.

== Political career ==
=== 2022 general election ===
In 2022, while affiliated with the Liberal Party (PL), Cardoso was chosen as first substitute senator on the ticket of senate candidate Wilder Morais, who won the election in Goiás with the support of former president Jair Bolsonaro.

The opposition ticket in Goiás in 2022 included Major Vitor Hugo for governor, Keila Borges for vice governor and Wilder Morais for the Senate. Cardoso and Hélio Araújo served as substitute senators on Morais's ticket.

During the 2022 campaign, she participated in political rallies and campaign caravans alongside Wilder Morais, Vanderlan Cardoso and Bolsonaro allies in Goiás.

=== 2024 municipal election ===
In January 2024, Cardoso left the Liberal Party and joined the Social Democratic Party (PSD), led in Goiás by Vanderlan Cardoso.

That same year, she ran for mayor of Senador Canedo.

Cardoso received 15,501 votes, corresponding to 22.42% of the valid votes, and finished in third place.

=== 2026 Goiás gubernatorial election ===
In 2026, Vanderlan Cardoso stated that Izaura remained politically aligned with Wilder Morais and that “if it depended on her, she would return to the PL”.

The statement was made amid Wilder Morais's pre-candidacy for governor of Goiás, since in the event of his election Cardoso would assume a seat in the Federal Senate.

Later in 2026, Vanderlan stated that Cardoso would remain neutral in the gubernatorial race because of her position as Wilder Morais's substitute senator and Vanderlan's political alignment with governor Ronaldo Caiado.

Cardoso also became president of PSD Mulher in Goiás, the women's wing of the PSD in the state.

== Electoral history ==
Year	Election	Party	Office	Votes	Result
2022	State	Liberal Party	First substitute senator	799,022	Elected
2024	Municipal	Social Democratic Party	Mayor of Senador Canedo	15,501	Not elected
