= Jonathan Island =

Island in Washington County, Rhode Island, United States

Coordinates: 41.4023°N 71.5018°W

Jonathan Island is a privately owned island in Point Judith Pond in Narragansett, Rhode Island, United States. It is 2.79 acres-wide. As of 2012, it is the world's fourth most expensive island. It is owned by Ben and Diane Franford.
