= Thiago Cardoso =

Brazilian footballer

Personal information
- Date of birth: 4 August 1991 (age 35)
- Place of birth: Juiz de Fora-MG, Brazil
- Height: 1.85 m (6 ft 1 in)
- Position: Centre back

Youth career
- 2009–2011: Atlético Mineiro

Senior career*
Years	Team	Apps	(Gls)
2009	Atlético Mineiro	2	(0)
2011–2013	Westerlo	8	(0)
2013–2014	Sintrense	13	(1)
2014	Beira-Mar	0	(0)
2014–2015	Madureira	32	(0)
2015–2016	Macaé	24	(0)
2016	Estoril	6	(0)

International career
2010	Brazil U20		
- * Club domestic league appearances and goals

Thiago Cardoso (born 4 August 1991) is a Brazilian former professional footballer who played as a centre-back.

== Career ==
=== Mineiro ===
He began his playing career at Clube Atlético Mineiro, making his debut in national league on 16 August 2009. He played the full match that losing to Corinthians 0–2. He played his second appearance on 2 September, replacing Wason Rentería in the 70th minute. That match Atlético lost 0–3 to Internacional. He also played the 2 matches of 2009 Copa Sudamericana.

=== Europe ===
In January 2014 he was signed by Portuguese club Beira-Mar. On 28 March 2014 his contract was terminated.

=== Return to Brazil ===
On 7 April 2014 he was signed by Rio de Janeiro club Madureira. The contract was confirmed by CBF on 25 April.
