= Love and Pain (Munch) =

Painting by Edvard Munch

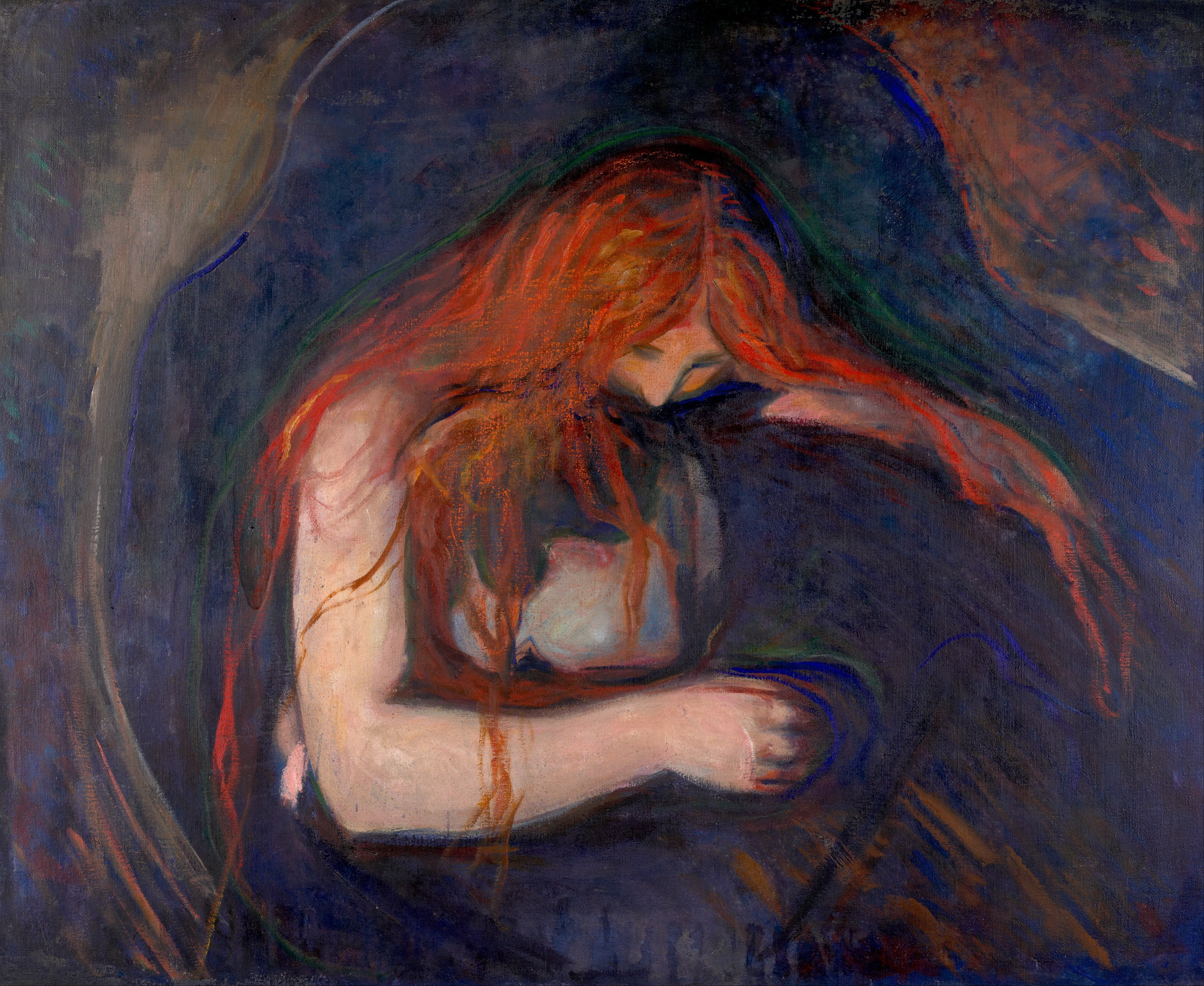
- Artist: Edvard Munch
- Year: 1895
- Medium: Oil on canvas
- Dimensions: 77.5 cm × 98.5 cm (30.5 in × 38.8 in)
- Location: Munch Museum, Oslo

Love and Pain is an 1895 painting by Edvard Munch; it has also been called Vampire, though not by Munch. The painting depicts a man and woman embracing, with the woman kissing the man on his neck. Munch painted six different versions of the same subject between 1893 and 1895. Three versions are in the collection of the Munch Museum in Oslo, one is held by the Gothenburg Museum of Art, one is owned by a private collector, and the final work is unaccounted for. Munch painted several additional versions and derivatives of the work later in his career.

== Description ==
The painting shows a woman with long flame-red hair kissing a man on the neck, as the couple embrace. Although others have seen in it "a man locked in a vampire's tortured embrace – her molten-red hair running along his soft bare skin", Munch himself always claimed it showed nothing more than "just a woman kissing a man on the neck".

The painting was first called Vampire by Munch's friend, the critic Stanisław Przybyszewski. Przybyszewski saw the painting on exhibition and described it as "a man who has become submissive, and on his neck a biting vampire's face."

=== Versions ===
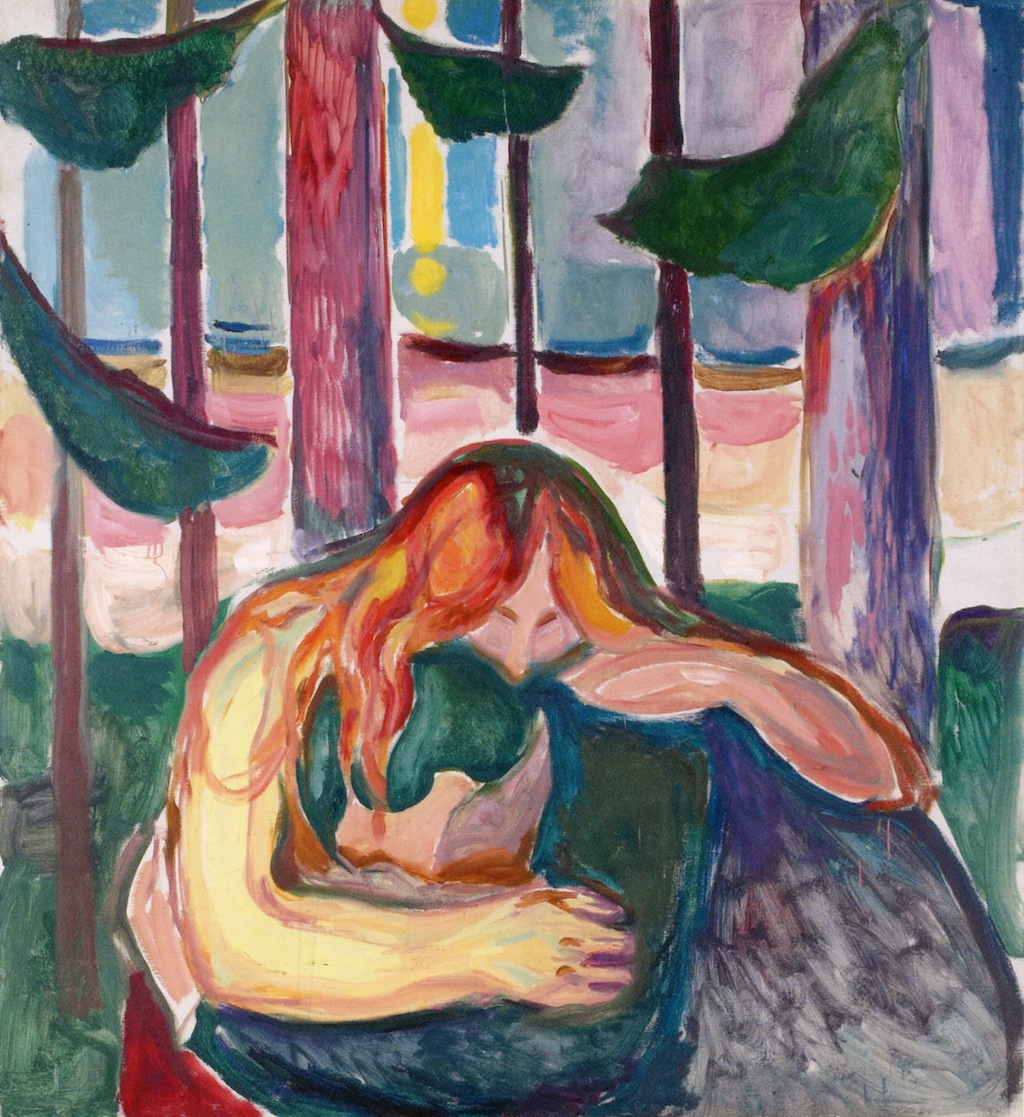
Vampire in the Forest (1916–18)

A version of the painting was stolen from the Munch Museum on 23 February 1988. It was recovered later the same year, when the thief contacted the police.

In 2008, at a Sotheby's auction, an 1894 version of the painting sold for 38.2 million dollars (24.3 million pounds) and set the world record for the auction of a Munch painting.

In 1895, Munch created a woodcut with a very similar theme and composition, known as Vampyr II.

In 1916–1918, Munch reused the composition in a different setting for two paintings called Vampire in the Forest and Vampire, currently in the collection of the Munch Museum.

Vampyr II (1895)

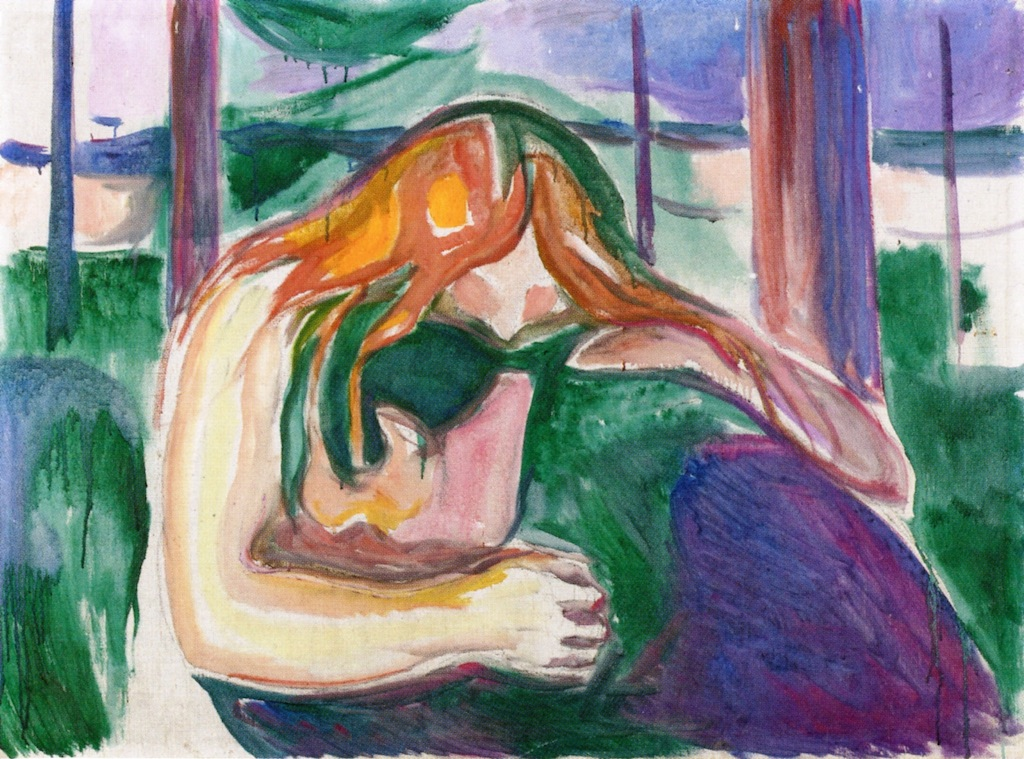
Vampire (1916–18)

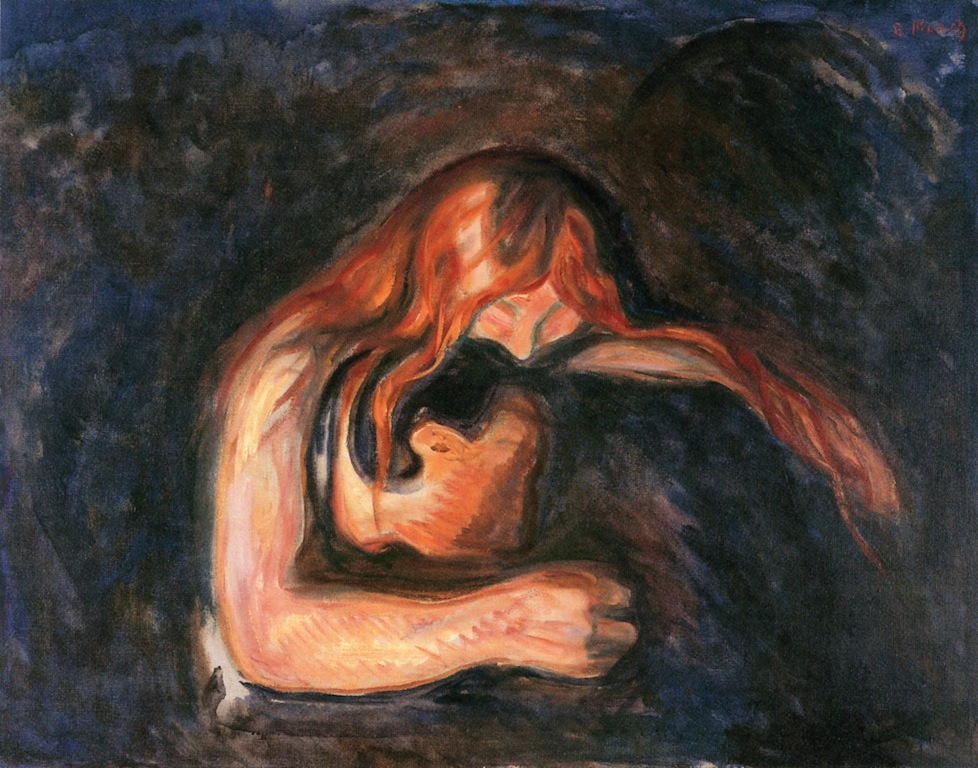
Vampire (1916–18)

== See also ==
- List of paintings by Edvard Munch
