= Jonathan =

Jonathan may refer to:

- Jonathan (name), a masculine given name

== Media ==
- Jonathan (1970 film), a German film directed by Hans W. Geißendörfer
- Jonathan (2016 film), a German film directed by Piotr J. Lewandowski
- Jonathan (2018 film), an American film directed by Bill Oliver
- Jonathan (Buffy comic), a 2001 comic book based on the Buffy the Vampire Slayer television series
- Jonathan (TV show), a Welsh-language television show hosted by ex-rugby player Jonathan Davies

== People and biblical figures ==
=== Bible ===
- Jonathan (1 Samuel), son of King Saul of Israel and friend of David, in the Books of Samuel
- Jonathan (Judges), in the Book of Judges
- Jonathan (son of Abiathar), in 2 Samuel and 1 Kings

=== Judaism ===
- Jonathan Apphus, fifth son of Mattathias and leader of the Hasmonean dynasty of Judea from 161 to 143 BCE
- Rabbi Jonathan, 2nd century
- Jonathan (High Priest), a High Priest of Israel in the 1st century

=== Footballers ===
- Jonathan (footballer, born 1991)
- Jonathan (footballer, born 1992)
- Jonathan (footballer, born 1998)
- Jonathan (footballer, born 1999)

== Other ==
- Jonathan (apple), a variety of apple
- "Jonathan" (song), a 2015 song by French singer and songwriter Christine and the Queens featuring Perfume Genius
- Jonathan (tortoise), a Seychelles Giant tortoise, the oldest verified land animal
- Jonathan Island, a privately owned island off the coast of Narragansett, Rhode Island, US
- Jonathan, Minnesota, the "new town" development in Chaska, Minnesota, US
- Jonathan the Husky, the mascot of the University of Connecticut
- Jonathan Joestar, the main protagonist of the first part of the Japanese manga series Jojo's Bizarre Adventure

== See also ==
- Johnathan, a related given name
- Hovnatanian, an Armenian family whose name derives from the equivalent of Jonathan
- Jonatan
- Jonathas
