= Jonatas (footballer, born 1983) =

Brazilian footballer

Personal information
- Full name: Jonatas Oliveira Cardoso
- Date of birth: March 30, 1983 (age 43)
- Place of birth: São Paulo, Brazil
- Height: 1.75 m (5 ft 9 in)
- Position: Striker

Team information
- Current team: América-SP

Youth career
- 1999–2001: São Carlense-SP

Senior career*
Years	Team	Apps	(Gls)
2001–2004	Guarani	28	(1)
2005–2011	Atlético Paranaense	9	(2)
2005	→ Figueirense (Loan)	6	(0)
2006	→ Portuguesa Santista (Loan)		
2006	→ Ituano (Loan)		
2007	→ Santo André (Loan)		
2008	→ Paraná (Loan)		
2009–2010	→ Olimpi Rustavi (loan)	9	(3)
2011	→ Joinville (Loan)		
2012–	América-SP		
- * Club domestic league appearances and goals

Jonatas Oliveira Cardoso (born March 30, 1983, in São Paulo), or simply Jonatas, is a Brazilian striker. He currently plays for América-SP.

== Honours ==
- Paraná State League: 2005

== Contract ==
- Paraná (Loan) 1 March 2008 to 31 December 2008
- Atlético-PR 2 August 2006 to 1 August 2009
