= Paula Cardoso (journalist) =

Portuguese journalist and activist (born 1979)

- Born: 1979 (age 46–47); Beira, Sofala, Mozambique
- Education: University of Lisbon
- Occupation: Journalist

Paula Cardoso (born 1979) is a Portuguese journalist, writer and anti-racist activist. She is the creator of the children's book series Força Africana and the online platform Afrolink.

== Biography ==
Paula Cardoso was born in 1979 in Beira, Mozambique. At the age of three, she moved to Portugal. Cardoso graduated from the Institute of Social and Political Sciences at the University of Lisbon, with a degree in international relations. She later specialised in journalism at the Protocol Training Centre for Journalists (CENJOR).

Between 2003 and 2006, she worked on the editorial staff of Visão magazine, after which she joined the editorial staff of the newspaper Sol. In 2012, she moved to Angola, where she worked as editor-in-chief of the newspaper Agora. In 2016, she took over as online editor of Novo Jornal, where she worked until 2019. She returned to Portugal in 2017.

In 2019, she became involved in anti-racist activism and initiated a project to promote greater black representation. She began by creating a brand of children's books, Força Africana, with black characters as protagonists, with the aim of valuing African culture. In June 2020, she launched Afrolink, an online platform for publicising and promoting businesses and projects by African and Afro-descendant professionals in Portugal.

In September 2020, she became co-host of the online talk-show O Lado Negro da Força, which showcased racialised people from a wide range of fields. In 2021, she became the presenter of the second season of RTP África's Black Excellence Talk Series and was part of the content production team for RTP2's talk-show Jantar Indiscreto, both created by Myriam Taylor.

Since July 2021, Cardoso has written for the publication Setenta e Quatro. She is also part of the civil society project Fórum dos Cidadãos, where she coordinates the DeliberaEscola project, which aims to broaden notions of democracy and disseminate practices of deliberation in the school environment.

== Awards and recognition ==
In 2022, Paula Cardoso was selected to be part of the Top 100 Women in Social Enterprise 2022 list by the Euclid Network. Cardoso was honoured for her work in promoting representation and innovation.
