= Jhonathan Camargo =

Venezuelan cyclist

Jhonatan Camargo
Personal information
- Full name: Jhonatan Alexis Camargo Mendoza
- Born: 31 July 1988 (age 38) Capacho Nuevo, Táchira, Venezuela

Cycling career
- Sport: Cycling
- Current team: Loteria del Táchira
- Discipline: Road
- Role: Rider

Amateur teams
- 2007: Gobernación del Zulia
- 2007–2008: Alcaldía de Cabimas–BOD
- 2008–2009: Lotería del Táchira
- 2010: Kino Táchira
- 2010: Lotería de Boyacá
- 2010–2012: Gobernación del Zulia
- 2013–2014: Kino Táchira
- 2013: Lotería del Táchira
- 2014–2015: Gobernación del Táchira–Concafé
- 2014: Convergence Sportive Cycliste Abymes
- 2015: UC Moule
- 2015–2016: JHS Aves
- 2016: AS Baie-Mahault
- 2018: Inversiones Alexander's
- 2019–: Loteria del Táchira

Jhonatan Alexis Camargo Mendoza (born July 31, 1988) is a Venezuelan professional racing cyclist.

== Major results ==
2008
3rd Road race, National Road Championships
5th Overall Vuelta al Táchira

1st Stage 8

2010
4th Overall Vuelta al Táchira

1st Stage 6

2011
9th Overall Vuelta al Táchira

1st Mountains classification
1st Stage 10

2012
7th Overall Vuelta al Táchira
2013
3rd Overall Vuelta a Venezuela
8th Overall Vuelta al Táchira
2014
3rd Overall Vuelta al Táchira

1st Points classification
1st Mountains classification
1st Stages 4, 7, 8 & 9

4th Overall Vuelta a Venezuela
10th Overall Tour de Guadeloupe

1st Stage 7

2015
5th Overall Vuelta al Táchira
2016
5th Overall Vuelta al Táchira
2020
7th Overall Vuelta al Táchira
