= Jonata =

Brazilian footballer

Personal information
- Full name: Jonata de Oliveira Bastos
- Date of birth: 26 November 1997 (age 28)
- Place of birth: Pilar, Brazil
- Height: 1.88 m (6 ft 2 in)
- Position: Forward

Team information
- Current team: Tarxien Rainbows

Youth career
- 2015–2017: CRB

Senior career*
Years	Team	Apps	(Gls)
2015–2017	CRB	3	(0)
2017	→ Cruzeiro (loan)	7	(0)
2018–2019	Estoril	8	(0)
2018	→ Braga B (loan)	15	(2)
2020–2022	Alverca	32	(12)
2022	Vila Nova	0	(0)
2022–2023	Oliveirense	25	(5)
2023–2024	Visakha	28	(10)
2024	Sliema Wanderers	11	(2)
2025	Águia de Marabá	15	(2)
2025	Tarxien Rainbows	8	(0)
2026	Itabaiana	12	(2)
2026–	ASA	8	(0)
- * Club domestic league appearances and goals as of 19 November 2026

Jonata de Oliveira Bastos (born 26 November 1997), simply known as Jonata, is a Brazilian professional footballer who plays as a forward for Maltese side Tarxien Rainbows.

== Career ==
Jonata started his professional career at CRB in his native state. After an outstanding performance in the 2017 Campeonato Alagoano, he was loaned to Cruzeiro until February 2018. He first started at Cruzeiro's U20 team. Playing at the Campeonato Brasileiro Sub-20, he had several highlighted performances for the team. Leading Cruzeiro's U20 team in goals scored and helping the team to get the Campeonato Brasileiro Sub-20 title. In the absence of several Cruzeiro's forwards due to injuries, Cruzeiro's coach Mano Menezes promoted him to the senior team. On 5 November 2017 he debuted for Cruzeiro on the match against Clube Atlético Paranaense. Jonata replaced Giorgian De Arrascaeta in the game's 84th minute. On 15 November, he started his first match for Cruzeiro. Playing 56 minutes in the tie against Avaí FC.
