= Jonatan =

Jonatan is a given name. Notable people with the name include:

- Jonatan (footballer) (born 1992), Brazilian football midfielder, full name Jonatan da Silva Lima
- Jonatan Berg (born 1985), Swedish football midfielder
- Jonatan Berggren (born 2000), Swedish ice hockey player
- Jonatan Briel (1942–1988), German director, screenplay author, and actor
- Jonatán Dobroslav Čipka, 19th century Slovak priest, poet and author
- Jonatan Cerrada (born 1985), Belgian-born singer, the first French Pop Idol
- Jonatan Christie (born 1997), Indonesian badminton player
- Jonatan Leandoer Håstad (born 1996), Swedish rapper better known by the stage name Yung Lean
- Jonatan Johansson (footballer) (born 1975), Finnish footballer
- Jonatan Johansson (snowboarder) (1980–2006), Swedish Olympic snowboarder
- Jonatan Kopelev (born 1991), Israeli swimmer
- Jonatan Romero (born 1987), Colombian boxer
- Jonatan Söderström (born 1985), Swedish independent video game developer
- Jonatan Tollås (born 1990), Norwegian football striker
- Jonatan Valle Trueba (born 1984), Spanish footballer

== See also ==
- Jonathan (name)
