= The Luis Jiménez Show =

Radio show in the New York area

The Luis Jiménez Show is one of the longest running morning radio shows in the general market and, is in the Spanish language, created and hosted by Luis Jiménez, and broadcast from WXNY-FM in New York City (Feb 2007- Jul 2014) and syndicated live to a number of different markets in the US. Before that he was the host and creator of the concept radio morning show; El Vacilon de La Mañana on WSKQ, (SBS) from 1993-2006, being the only morning show that de-trown Howard Stern several times back when he was in Terrestrial Radio. Luis Jiménez has now created his own network which listeners can subscribe to from all over the world and listen to his radio comedy and talk show through Luis Network

== History ==
During the first two weeks of January 2007, new airings of El Vacilón de la Mañana were discontinued, and only pre-recorded programs were aired, coinciding with Luis Jiménez's departure from the program. He signed a contract with the Univisión Radio network, but that contract prevented him with previous non-competitive agreements to air any new program in New York City during El Vacilón's allotted time slot until 2008.

On February 21, 2007, Luis Jiménez started producing his own show The Luis Jiménez Show which began to be broadcast in several cities in the US, such as Dallas, Chicago, Los Angeles, among others through different Univisión Radio stations. In January, 2008, the Luis Jiménez Show arrived in NYC, taking an instant step in becoming #3 in the market.

Only some members of Vacilón de la Mañana followed Luis Jiménez to his new show. These were "Yun-Yún", "DJ Chucky" musical director, Metadona and his producer María Alma. Later followed "Sonny Flow", sound editor, and Rubén "El Moreno" who became part of The Luis Jiménez Show crew and in 2011 "Bocachula" and "El Shorty", after making an appearance and patching things with Luis Jiménez live in the program, joined the show.

The Luís Jiménez Show was canceled abruptly by Univisión Radio on July 22, 2014, without explanation. Members of the show have expressed on their own that the show will continue, not being specific if in Univisión Radio or elsewhere, and Carolina Cadillo posted on her Facebook page that "The best is yet to come".

== Overview ==
The Luis Jiménez Show has various key elements: prank calls, musical parodies, comedy sketches, humorous commentary about straight and odd news, and open telephone lines.

The program's key player is Luis Jiménez (born on March 26, 1970, in San Juan, Puerto Rico). Many people help Jiménez with the show. Some of the regular participants have been Fay (a Colombian/Puerto Rican/lesbian co-host), who was part of the show until departing in late 2010 or early 2011, Speedy (rather "slow" comic relief), Guebín, Metadona ("former" drug lord and substance abuse expert), Rubén "El Moreno" (prank call man) and Alma (producer and co host ). There were back while on Univision other members of the show with lesser roles, such as Negra Pola, Deebo a Nuyorican from The Bronx (who can't speak Spanish nor proper English) and "Las gemelas de Luis" (Luis' twins), a pair of Latino American twin sisters also called Lulu and Lala.

Each member of the team is known for a perceived self-avowed defect or particularity: Luis Jiménez claims to have undersized genitalia and hypospadias, Metadona (who died in December 2016) was allegedly a former cocaine addict who suffered from many speech dysfunctions as a result, and so on.

== Prank calls ==
Prank calls are usually presented in a section called Dando Lata (being a nuisance or simply bothering), in which unwitting people are called to their homes or job places and are provoked with touchy subjects for the prank victims (generally, they are taunted with intimate subjects). These prank calls are made by request from friends or family of the victims.

In 2004, as Rubén Ithier, also known as Rubén El Moreno, was sent back to his country of origin, the Dominican Republic, this section was discontinued from El Vacilón de la Mañana show. These days, the Luis Jiménez show has re-hired Rubén to do his pranks from overseas. At first Rubén was living in his native country (Dominican Republic), and he would do his calls from there, but early in 2009], Rubén moved to Barcelona, Spain, and he has become a permanent resident of this country, so now the prank calls are conducted from Spain. Rubén El Moreno new nickname for the show is Rubén El Gallego.

== Comedic characters ==
Luis Jiménez, who used to play all the comedic characters in his previous shows, plays various characters in fifteen-minute segments on the show (usually three a day). Among them: Romeo, a parody on Dominican lead singer of the group Aventura; Caballo Ventura, a very sexual and strong male caller, who is in love with Alma; El Chef Pipí, a parody on Cuban chef and Univisión television personality José Hernández, better known as Chef Pepín, being Chef Pipí's main trait his questionable masculinity; Goyito, a schoolkid but a perennial foul-mouthed prankster and Federico "Pedrito" Rivera Rodríguez, better known as Findingo, a chronic marijuana smoker with a strong speech impairment.
