= Arcila (surname) =

Arcila is a Spanish surname with significant usage in Colombia. Notable people with the surname include:

- Daniel Arcila (born 2002), Colombian footballer
- Isabella Arcila (born 1994), Colombian swimmer
- Jhon Arcila (born 2006), Colombian footballer
- Paula Arcila (born 1975), Colombian television personality

== See also ==
- Archila
- Arcilla
