= ¿Quién Tiene la Razón? =

US television program

- Presented by: Nancy Álvarez (2003–2012); Carmen Jara (2012–2015); Ana Sobero; Alexander Otaola; Saul Gutiérrez
- Country of origin: United States
- Original language: Spanish

Production
- Camera setup: Multi-camera
- Running time: 42–45 minutes

Original release
- Network: Telefutura; Venevisión Plus; UniMás; Univision; Venevision International
- Release: July 7, 2003 – August 10, 2015

¿Quién Tiene La Razón? (English: Who's Right?) is a Latin American talk show produced by Venevisión International Productions and hosted by the Mexican presenter, singer and actress Carmen Jara. The program began in 2003 with the conduction of Dr. Nancy Álvarez, is broadcast by Venevisión Plus in Venezuela and Ve Plus in Latin America. In the United States it was broadcast by Univision until 2011; from September 26, 2011 it is broadcast by Telefutura at 7:00 p.m. / 6:00 p.m. (central), and then on October 10 it was changed to the 3:00 p.m. / 2:00 p.m. (central) time slot until 2015 in a programming change.

== History ==
Telefutura originally aired this talk show from July 7, 2003, to August 29, 2008, weekday afternoons at 3 pm Central. From November 17, 2008, to August 25, 2011, it was broadcast by Telefutura's parent network Univision weekday mornings at 10 am Central.

In August 2011, Telefutura announced a brand new season of ¿Quién Tiene la Razón?; from September 26 to October 7, 2011, Telefutura broadcast it weeknights at 7 pm Central. From October 10, 2011, to April 30, 2012, Telefutura broadcast it weekdays at 3 pm Central.

In July 2012, Telefutura and Venevisión announced that Carmen Jara would become the new presenter of ¿Quién Tiene la Razón?, replacing Dra. Nancy Álvarez. As of July 30, 2012, Telefutura is broadcasting new episodes of ¿Quién Tiene la Razón? with Carmen Jara being the new host.

== Format ==
The format of the program consists of presenting two or three cases about families or couples who are in some kind of conflict who seek advice from the host, Carmen Jara. Likewise, there are also the so-called "Cuatachos"; these, together with Jara, listen to the arguments of all parties.

After the arguments of the panelists, the opinion of who is right is heard from the "Cuatachos", giving their opinion based on which side they think has the strongest argument, then the opinion of the audience is heard and, finally, that of Carmen Jara, who gives the panelists the tools and observations to solve the problem they present.

== Presenters and Other collaborators ==
=== Presenters ===
Current
Name	Period	Current Role
Carmen Jara	2012 — 2015	Main Presenter
Past
Nancy Álvarez	2003 — 2012	Main Presenter

=== Los Archis ===
During these cases, the host is assisted by a panel of three observers known as "Los Archis" (which is short for either "Los Archiamigos" or "Los Archienemigos", Spanish terms best translated within the show's context as "The Arch-allies" or "The Arch-enemies", depending on whose side of the dispute the panel is leaning towards), who question the parties and can provide advocacy to their situation.

Past Archis included Rafael Mercadante and Paula Arcila.

=== Other contributors (Archis and Cuatachos) ===
- Alan Jacott
- Diana Montoya
- Noe Mendez
- Angie Braaten
- Miguel Angel Masjuan
- Sofia Azcue
- Antonio Perez
- Paula Arcila
- Rafael Mercadante
- Alexander Otaola
- Anna Sobero
- Saul Gutierrez
- Andy Sanchez

=== Changes ===
Since September 26, 2011, the program is broadcast by Telefutura, which caused slight changes in the program's format:

- The opinion of the "Archis" was no longer unified; instead, each "Archi" (now called "cuatachos") gave his or her opinion about the conflict that the panelists brought to the program.
- The audience does not give their opinion through a single person; now, it is done through a vote with three options, in general: those who are on one side, on the other, or those who believe that no one is right. The result is then offered through a percentage. This change and the one previously mentioned have been adopted first in the Brazilian version.
- Recently, Dr. Nancy went to any city in the American Union. It started with New York.
- Dr. Nancy went to where she was called by her panelists, where the corresponding case was presented. Presenting, even though the case took place outside the studio, the same dynamic, where the "Archis" and the audience gave their opinion, and then listened to that of Dr. Nancy Alvarez.
- In 2012, Dr. Nancy announced that she had been removed from that program and that it would be hosted by Carmen Jara. Likewise, the "archis" (now called "cuatachos" in the new version) have not continued in the program, only Alexander Otaola who came since the last season with Dr. Álvarez, now accompanied by Anna Sobero (replacing Paula Arcila) and Saúl Gutiérrez (replacing Rafael Mercadante).

== Controversy with Venezuela's CONATEL ==
Who's Right? began airing in Venezuela on Venevisión Plus; however, from Monday, April 5, 2010, it was broadcast from 11 a.m. to 12 p.m. on Venevisión and, due to its good audience ratings, its schedule was changed from Monday to Friday from 10 a.m. to 1 p.m. at 12 p.m., adding one more hour.

However, in December of that same year the program was taken off the air by order of the (CONATEL) because, according to the guidelines of the so-called RESORTE Law, it was considered unfit to be broadcast at that time (since, according to that law, it is part of the so-called "children's schedule"). Due to this, the program was re-broadcast by the cable television network belonging to Venevisión, Venevisión Plus, during its regular time slot.

== Versions ==
- Quem Convence Ganha Mais, broadcast by SBT every Friday at 8:15 p.m., from August 5, 2011 to January 13, 2012, hosted by Suzy Camacho.
