= Gabriel Velasco =

Gabriel Velasco may refer to:

- Gabriel Velasco (politician) (born 1973), Colombian lawyer, businessman and politician
- Gabriel Velasco (footballer) (born 1986), Mexican football manager and former player
