= Caliente (TV series) =

- Presented by: Charlie Bravo (1995-2003); Diana Franco (1995-1997); Sandra Muñoz (2001-2002); Rafael Mercadante (2003-2006)
- No. of episodes: 417

Production
- Running time: April 8, 1995-July 25, 1998 (30 minutes) August 1, 1998-March 11, 2006 (60 minutes)

Original release
- Network: Univision
- Release: April 8, 1995 – March 11, 2006

Caliente was a Spanish-language teen magazine-style television series that aired on Univision in the United States. The show featured music, dancing, fashion and celebrities at a beachside location. It aired from April 8, 1995 to March 11, 2006, with 417 episodes. In the 2000s, Alien Visions joined the project to generate the guidelines for a new version called Descontrol on Telemundo, which had a pilot episode.

It was hosted by Anthony Gatsby, who is a fundamental part of this project. It was presented by Charlie Bravo and Diana Franco, until Rafael Mercadante took control on March 1, 2003. It could be described as a kind of Latin Soul Train. Caliente featured some of the biggest names in Latin music, including live segments by Celia Cruz and Daddy Yankee. The show was filmed primarily in Miami, Florida, but was also recorded in New York, Chicago, Los Angeles, Puerto Rico, Mexico, the Dominican Republic, and many others.

== Episode list airdate ==
- January 17, 1998: Las Vegas, NV
- October 31, 1998: Miami, FL
- September 11, 1999: San Antonio, TX
- February 5, 2000: Acapulco, Guerrero, Mexico
- March 11, 2000: Puerto Vallarta, Jalisco, Mexico
- March 18, 2000: Miami, FL
- August 12, 2000: Boston, MA
- September 2, 2000: Santo Domingo, Dominican Republic
- October 7, 2000: Puerto Rico
- April 14, 2001: Miami, FL
- June 9, 2001: Malibu, CA
- July 7, 2001: Key West, FL
- July 21, 2001: Redondo Beach, CA
- August 4, 2001: Las Vegas, NV
- August 18, 2001: Corpus Christi, TX
- October 6, 2001: Sacramento, CA
- October 20, 2001: Santa Monica, CA
- October 27, 2001: Miami, FL
- November 3, 2001: Miami, FL
- January 5, 2002: Santo Domingo, Dominican Republic
- January 19, 2002: Honolulu, Hawaii
- May 4, 2002: Miami, FL
- August 10, 2002: Mar de la Plata, Argentina
- October 5, 2002: New York City
- November 16, 2002: Cancún, Quintana Roo, Mexico
- December 28, 2002: Honduras
- January 25, 2003: Orlando, FL
- July 26, 2003: Cuernavaca, Mexico
- September 20, 2003: Redondo Beach, CA
- November 8, 2003: Miami, FL
- September 25, 2004: Albuquerque, NM
- May 28, 2005: Acapulco, Guerrero, Mexico
- July 9, 2005: Santa Clara, CA
- November 5, 2005: Chicago, IL

== DVD release ==
Univision Networks currently has no plans to release the music show on DVD at this time.
