= Archila =

Archila is a surname. Notable people with the surname include:

- Ana Maria Archila (born 1978/1979), Colombian-born US activist
- Andrés Archila (1913–2002), Guatemalan violinist and orchestra conductor
- Fredy Archila (born 1973), Guatemalan botanist
- William Archila (born 1968), Salvadoran poet and writer

== See also ==
- Arcila (surname)
- Arcilla
