= El Vacilón de la Mañana =

Radio program

El Vacilón de la Mañana is a Spanish language weekday morning radio show. The show originates from WSKQ-FM in New York City, a Spanish radio station branded as "Mega 97.9", and it is syndicated live to a number of different markets in the US such as Providence, Rhode Island; Miami and Orlando, Florida; Atlanta, Georgia; Hartford, Connecticut; and Puerto Rico.

The word "vacilón" is not directly translatable into English; it derives from the Spanish verb vacilar (to vacillate), but in colloquial Spanish can also mean to "check someone out" or to "have fun." Thus, the show's name roughly translates in English to "The Morning Tease."

== History ==
During the first two weeks of January 2007, new airings of this program were discontinued, and only pre-recorded programs were aired, coinciding with Luis Jiménez's departure from the program. He has signed a contract with the Univision Radio network, but is prevented by previous non-competitive agreements to air any new program in New York City during El Vacilón's allotted time slot until 2008. Most of the program's crew has chosen to remain contracted to La Mega.and contract DJ CASTRO from Texas and Sonido Promax #1 in California, thanks to him is now the number one in USA.

As of mid-January 2007, Spanish Broadcasting System (SBS) owned WSKQ (La Mega 97.9 FM) brought two new hosts to the show, Dominican-born Juan Carlos Alonso (who sounds just like Luis Jiménez), and Puerto Rican Frankie Jay (who also sounds like Moonshadow) which are now replacing Luis Jiménez and Moonshadow. Juan Carlos Alonso was relocated from another SBS station in Orlando, Florida and Frankie Jay was relocated from another SBS station in Puerto Rico. Juan Carlos and Frankie Jay voice resemblance to the former hosts have sparked a number of accusations of trying to imitate the former Vacilón hosts Luis Jiménez and Moonshadow (the main reason SBS brought them to NY).

During 2007 Luis Jiménez and SBS were involved in a legal fight because SBS claims Luis Jiménez was cashing in on the name of the morning show through the release of his DVD movie El Vacilón the Movie which was released on January 30, 2007. Luis Jiménez filed a counter-lawsuit accusing SBS of trying to fool the audience by having Juan Carlos and Frankie Jay imitate the voices and style of Luis Jiménez and Moonshadow, and also accuses his former team members of betrayal and stealing his intellectual property by using characters such as Dr. Hector Tilla and Madam Melo. In early January 2008 Spanish Broadcasting System officially won the legal fight.

Since February 21, 2007, Luis Jiménez started producing his own show The Luis Jiménez Show and it is being broadcast in several cities in the US, such as Dallas, Chicago, Los Angeles, among others through different Univision Radio stations. It is expected to expand into more cities during this year as Univision Radio introduces the show to new markets, but it is not expected to make it into NYC until 2008. Only two of the members of the old "Vacilón de la Mañana" have followed Luis Jiménez to his new show. These are "Yun Yun" and "Sonny Flow", the latter one being "DJ Chucky" who just became part of "The Luis Jiménez Show" crew. Alma, who is Luis's producer, is also part of the new show in Univision Radio.

Moonshadow has come back to El Vacilón de la Mañana and together with Juan Carlos and Franky Jay had been able to stay ahead of the Luis Jiménez Show (3.9 to 2.0 in the ratings). Although when The Luis Jiménez Show made it to NYC early in 2008. Upon his departure from El Vacilón de la Mañana Luis Jiménez also took the morning show's website with him. For the entire year of 2007 the domain name "www.elvacilon.com" belonged to his producer Maria Alma and therefore SBS and WSKQ La Mega 97.9 FM were unable to use the website address for the show. A new website for El Vacilón was created www.elvacilon.org.In early 2008, after the lawsuit the domain name "elvacilon dot com" was returned to SBS and is run on the web servers of Spanish Broadcasting System(SBS)

== The Miami Vacilón ==
An equally named program was broadcast by another SBS affiliate station in Miami: WXDJ-FM (El Zol 95.7), a fact that raised confusion among some listeners in both markets until March 2003. The hosts of El Vacilón Miami were Enrique Santos (a former police officer turned funny man) and "The Professor" Joe Ferrero, both of Cuban-American descent. Early producer of the show Alberto Sardinas also joined the team at the time.

The two jokesters achieved national and international notoriety when on June 18, 2003, they prank-called Venezuelan president Hugo Chávez, which brought them plenty of press. They later used the same technique to prank-call Cuba's then-President Fidel Castro, the more notorious and more better known of the pranks. The team was fined by the FCC when an anonymous source filed a complaint with said government agency (as a result of the latter prank). The duo took to the streets of Miami and collected in pennies the entire amount of the fee and then some. Luckily, the radio station's legal eagles resolved the issue regarding the fine and all of the money collected was then donated to a local charity. They later used the same technique to crank call. In the history of radio broadcast this was the first time that a morning show had prank-called the leaders of two countries.

Despite the huge success of El Vacilón Miami, hosted by Enrique and Joe, it all came to a halt on March 5, 2007, when the hosts, fed up with the string of unfulfilled promises by Spanish Broadcasting Systems (SBS) and other issues, decided to walk out on air. They trashed the company for four hours of broadcast until they were eventually pulled off the air by management. The morning show was replaced with pre-recorded bits soon after. One week later, the only one of the show's main producers, Miguel Reyes alias Mikey Machete, was let go by the company. Reyes hosted the Saturday morning "Best Of" show which he also produced and achieved the number one spot in ratings for a Saturday morning show in the Tropical market. While SBS refused to give details on Mr. Reyes' firing, it appeared to be the result of the fall out following the early departure of the show's two hosts.

Enrique Santos and Joe Ferrero were signed to Univision's WRTO, Miami, La Kalle 98.3 FM for the time being. Luis Jiménez's and his morning show were being syndicated in various markets. Univision Radio returned both shows to their respective cities to take on SBS directly on early 2008. Mike Reyes, former producer for Enrique Santos & Joe Ferrero, return to radio also in early 2008 at the end of his non compete

From March 22, 2007, to March 1, 2008, "El Zol 95 FM" was broadcasting New York's El Vacilón de la Mañana which was also being syndicated in Puerto Rico. Since March 3, 2008, El Zol started El Vacilón de Miami with Neo Encendido and Los Pichy Boys (Alejandro González and Maikel Rodriguez) from 6 to 10 pm. The latter show was replaced in less than a year by Al Fuentes, former P.D. of various radio stations and Pio Ferro, V.P of Programming of SBS. Soon after that, Pio Ferro's employment was terminated and that morning show had become a one-man show.

The Enrique and Joe Show (with sidekick and producer Mikey Machete) on Miami's La Kalle 98.3 FM, in less than a years time, once again became the #1 rated Tropical (bi-lingual) morning show in South Florida with ratings numbers reaching double digits. In May 2009, the dynamic duo of Miami radio split up and two shows were created. In the morning The Enrique Santos Show, followed by Joe Ferrero y La Animalada (originally hosted for 5 months by Mikey Machete and Albertico Rodriguez) on La Kalle 98.3FM. In early spring 2010, changes started to take place in both radio stations and by mid-year, Enrique Santos was the only one from the original morning crew to be retained on 98.3's morning show as Univision restructured the station to fit Arbitron's new ratings methodology. The station, now re-branded as MIX 98.3, assumed a more bilingual style programing.

Joe Ferrero was let go by Univision Radio on June 4, 2010, along with (Mike Reyes) Mikey Machete. In October 2010 Joe Ferrero consequently took over El Vacilón de la Mañana on Spanish Broadcasting System's (WXDJ) El Zol 95.7 FM with new co-host Albertito Rodriguez as his sidekick and female co-host Betzy Vazquez. Mikey (Mike Reyes) Machete is currently the Promotions & Marketing director for ESPN Deportes Radio in Miami.

As of August 22, 2012, Joe Ferrero is no longer at SBS Miami. He was let go for no apparent reason and is currently the Operations Manager and morning show host at the all new 105.5 FM stations out of the Florida Keys. Some of the infamous duo's classic crank calls can still be heard on www.Marikonson.com In 2015, Ferrero became a morning host on WMGE (Mega 94.9) in the Miami/Frt Lauderdale market until 2016, when Joe Ferrero was let go from the station "for no apparent reason" as per the statement he released via his Instagram account.

== Overview ==
El Vacilón de la Mañana (roughly translated as the "Morning Party") has various key elements: prank calls, musical parodies, comedy sketches, humorous commentary about straight and odd news, and open telephone lines.

The program's key player is Luis Jiménez (born on March 26, 1970, in San Juan, Puerto Rico), who has been its main host for more than twelve years. Jiménez co-hosts the broadcast with Raymond Broussard (born in San Juan, Puerto Rico, on December 20, 1953, of Cajun and Puerto Rican descent) and who uses the stage name Moonshadow.

Luis Jiménez started his radio career in his hometown of Caguas, Puerto Rico as a teenager, working as a part-time disc-jockey in various local radio stations. He later moved to Orlando, Florida, achieving some recognition there as a morning radio host after holding various odd jobs. He was referred to La Mega's management as a suitable candidate for hosting a Spanish-language radio show in New York City and moved there in 1993. The program's first airing occurred on August 9.

Jiménez modeled his show after El Bufeo Matutino (The Morning Goof), a successful radio program in Puerto Rico that lasted twenty-two years in its various inceptions, and always had Moonshadow as its main producer and host. Luis Jiménez co-hosted the show with longtime friend Junior Hernandez. Hernandez suffered from asthma, and died of a heart attack. Fans streamed to the station to pay tribute to Hernandez the Thursday night after his death; the popular radio personality was only 34 years old. After Broussard's move to New York City in 1997, and after the death of Hernandez's in 1998, the program had a succession of co-hosts, with Moonshadow joining the show for good in 2000. Moonshadow can claim poetic justice about the fact that WZNT-FM, also known as Z-93, (Puerto Rico's main salsa radio station), which was the same radio station who fired him for being too controversial, now airs El Vacilón de la Mañana to Puerto Rico in direct Internet audio feed from La Mega every morning after a management change (SBS currently owns both stations). The first audio feed to Puerto Rico occurred on February 9, 2004. The program has since gone into syndication by ABC Networks in a few Latino markets within the United States; the first syndicated airing to Orlando, Florida and other Latino markets occurred on January 9, 2006.

Moonshadow (right) and Yun Yun Echevarría (center)at "El Gufeo Matutino at Z-93 (1980s)

While Moonshadow has gone on record in numerous times about modeling his original show after Howard Stern's (with a very strong dose of Puerto Rican cultural elements), Jiménez's numerous original contributions give the show a unique pan-Latino flavor (its largest audience appears to be the Dominican and Puerto Rican community in New York City). The result "out-Sterned" Stern's show, and El Vacilón's audienceship ratings surpassed Stern's for three years, until Stern's departure to satellite radio in 2005.

Jiménez and Moonshadow do not act alone: besides a sizeable audience participation, the show's announcers and assistant producers (called the Mequetrefes, or Whippersnappers) are key to the success of the show. This ragtag group feature a female traffic announcer (Carolina Cadillo, born in Newark, New Jersey, of Peruvian and Nicaraguan descent), a rather peculiar news announcer (Francis Méndez, born in Jarabacoa, Dominican Republic), the show's main audio producer (DJ Chucky), its call screeners and production assistants (Tony Sánchez, Bocachula, El Papichulo, etc.), and the like. The show's executive producer, María Eugenia Alma, appears sporadically in the show, particularly as female singer and occasional phone call prankster.

Each member of the team is known for a perceived self-avowed defect or particularity: Luis Jiménez claims to have undersized genitalia and hypospadias, Moonshadow has an inguinal hernia but reportedly has the fastest tongue in American radio history; Francis Méndez is allegedly a former cocaine addict who now suffers from erectile dysfunction as a result, Carolina Cadillo is a proud nymphomaniac who speaks Spanish with a noticeable English accent (Spanish is her second language) and who has virtually no buttocks, and so on.

== Prank calls ==
Prank calls are usually presented in a section called ¡Caíste! (You Fell for It!), in which unwitting people are called to their homes or job places and are provoked with touchy subjects for the prank victims (generally, they are taunted with intimate subjects). These prank calls are made by request from friends or family of the victims. The most famous prank call victim on the show's history was a Dominican building superintendent given the moniker Manolo Cabeza 'e Huevo by Jiménez, who played the part of a viciously irate jealous husband. Manolo's enraged, expletive-laden response has become the most copied and broadcast anecdote in the show's history. Manolo's son Israel, who coordinated the phone call, was in turn pranked in another memorable call.

After the deportation of the section's producer, Rubén Ithier, also known as Rubén El Moreno, back to his country of origin, the Dominican Republic in late 2004, this section went into limbo for close to a year and a half. Prank reruns were (and are still) played on the section's regularly slotted time.

During the hiatus, the current cast tried to pull some pranks of their own with mixed success, including repeated Manolo Cabeza 'e Huevo pranks, perhaps the most successful after Ithier's departure.

The cast resumed production of regularly scheduled ¡Caíste! pranks in early 2006.

In a similar sidenote, the Miami programme is also known for its share of pranks. Its notoriety came with the ¡Caiste! jokes made to Hugo Chávez and Fidel Castro (The former being pranked before the latter) while using pre-existing tape conversations (for the former, it was with a conversation between Castro and then-Mexican President Vicente Fox, while for the latter, the snippets of the prank which was done on Chávez was used). Both pranks had Joe Ferrero pretending to be a sergeant in some army. Needless to say, while the reaction of the former victim was absolute silence, Castro replied after Ferrero tripped up his (Castro's) words ("¿Estás conforme con toda la mierda que has hecho en la isla, asesino?" ["Are you conformed with all the shit that you did on the island, murderer?"]) with a slightly peeved response: "¿En qué caí, comemierda? ¿En qué caí, maricón? ¿En qué caí, mari-cón-són?" ("What did I fall in, shiteater? What did I fall in, queer? What did I fall in, you gay-fer?"). However, the FCC complained and slapped a fine to the two disc jockeys (Enrique Santos and Joe Ferrero); both chose not to pay, relying instead on a penny-drive. Its (the programme's) second-funniest joke is one that is called ¡Píntame! (Paint me!), in which the two prank call a painter by asking him "¿Usted es el pintor?" ("Are you the Painter?"), whereupon by using his response (which was always "¡Sí, yo soy el pintor!" ("Yes, I'm the painter!") they played a sample of Elvis Crespo's song "Píntame" (the first line of the song, to be exact: "'Píntame', le dije yo al pintor"; "'Paint me', I told the painter"), thus aggravating the man and angering him even further, thus launching a tirade of Dominican insults. Another famous prank made by the 2 DJs was their "Gonzalo Créo" saga; the first joke of which, "La vieja puta" ("The Old Bitch"), revolved around Santos prank calling a Cuban man by making said Cuban believe that he was in a telephoned confession booth, whereupon the Cuban said that he was being stalked by the grandmother of a friend of his. When one of Santos's associates is heard, the Cuban is outraged, and hangs up on him, whereupon, we hear Santos saying that he did not get a chance to ask for the Cuban's money; the rest of the prank (although it is funny) revolves around then trying to get the Cuban's money. More of the "Gonzalo Créo" jokes occurred, including "El Dolor del Vecino" (The Neighbor's Pain), using the same premise of pretense of a telephoned confession booth, which involves a man struggling with his apparent bisexuality and "Domingo Y Pancho" which involves them prank calling a man who is sexually aroused by a woman who is helping him with physical therapy for an illness of the nerves. A lot of the prank calls made by Enrique Santos and Joe Ferrero (During and after El Vacilón including the Enrique & Joe Show) have now been made available at www.Marikonson.com

The Federal Communications Commission considers the use of prank calls to be a violation of FCC policy, which prohibits recording unsolicited phone calls for broadcast, and fined WSKQ a penalty of $16,000 for a 2007 prank call, unless all parties agree with the recording being made public.

== Comedic characters ==
Luis Jiménez (and occasionally Moonshadow, who used to play all the comedic characters in his previous shows but has a more laid-back role on this one) play various characters in fifteen-minute segments on the show (usually three a day). Among them: Cornelio Toro, a naive store-owner whose wife has made a habit of being unfaithful to him with every man she comes in contact with while Toro fails to recognize it every time, even though he immediately knows when someone else is being cheated on (the name is a play on Spanish words: Cornelio sounds very much like "cuernudo", a cuckold, while Toro, or bull, evokes the bull's cuernos, or horns, the sign of the deceived man in Latin American culture); Jonathan Buford Rodriguez, better known as El Chulo, a gigolo who preys on geriatric women; El Chef Pipí, a parody on Cuban chef and Univision television personality José Hernández, better known as Chef Pepin, being Chef Pipí's main trait his questionable masculinity; Rebeca Larica, a hyperventilating, gum-chewing woman who craves for male attention (played by Moonshadow); Dr. Héctor Tilla, a self-proclaimed medical doctor with very rude manners and a long history of malpractice lawsuits; Paca Garmentí and Silvia Penacho Chafrías; two civic-minded single women (they are set apart, in the movie at least, by their hairstyle: Paca, played by Luis, has short black hair in braids, while Silvia, played by Moonshadow, has red hair styled similarly to the Wendy's girl), both over 60 years old, who love to bicker with each other (both names are plays on Spanish words: "Pa' cagarme en tí" is the informal way of saying "En tí me' cago", which means "I shit on you", while Silvia's name, whilst parts of it are normal, The clang comes with the word "chocha fría", which means something to the effect of "cold pussy"); Madam Melo (originally called Mamá Melo), a hyperkinetic Dominican santería practitioner (both names are plays on sexual references: "Madam Melo" is a play on "mandamelo", which means "Fuck me", whilst "Mamá Melo" is a play on the insult "mamamelo", which means "Suck it (my dick) for me"); Goyito and Memin, two schoolkids (Memin being a straight arrow, while Goyito is a perennial foul-mouthed prankster) and Federico "Pedrito" Rivera Rodriguez, better known as Findingo, a chronic marijuana smoker with a strong speech impairment.

Some of the ideas behind these characters are not entirely original: Cornelio Toro is the updated version of Toribio Tauro, a similar television character played by Puerto Rican comedic actor Adrián García on Puerto Rican television (and provided with an accent closely resembling that of Don Pulula, one of José Miguel Agrelot's characters); El Chulo evolved from a real human being who was a production assistant for one of Puerto Rico's radio morning shows who had a liking for geriatric women (and became famously made fun of by being called El Chupaviejas by the show's hosts), and Dr. Hector Tilla was another one of Moonshadow's creations while in the toilet. Goyito and Memin were originally created by Moonshadow after Pellín and Pillín, two animated characters from a Puerto Rican public service announcement, while Findingo's name was taken from a similarly named (although completely different) comedic character played by the Puerto Rican actor, René Rubiella; the original character shared a low intelligence quotient with the newer one, besides the name. The parody on Chef Pepin was rumored to be hated by the parodied celebrity because of its homoerotic undertones, but this was dispelled recently when Chef Pepín himself was invited to participate in a racy sketch along its comedic counterpart, the result being a hilarious interaction between the two characters which Chef Pepín clearly enjoyed.

Special mention has to be made about a real "character" who happens to be a regular caller to the show, and as of October 2005 has joined the cast on a part-time basis. Metadona is a real-life reformed robber, born in Ponce, Puerto Rico, who had a chronic drug addiction before rehabilitation. There are strong doubts about him being completely drug-free, but he vows to have abandoned his criminal past for good. His slow delivery (evoking a chronically drug-induced state) and daring stories about botched robberies and juvenile pranks entitled him to the alias, which is the Spanish word for methadone. He has a habit of loudly opening a beer can for breakfast every time he calls.

== Musical parodies ==
El Vacilón's musical parodies have recently become the show's bread and butter. Popular Latino songs are typically parodied in the show, generally changing the lyrics to sexually suggestive, humorous lyrics. Some original compositions are featured as well, and generally along the same subject matter. A few program guests, mainly reggaeton artists, have parodied their own regular songs in the show (and therefore have contributed with their own material). A few English-language songs are also parodied, but mostly fragments of them.

Newer songs are introduced in a weekly section called El Joyón Musical (joyón can be an augmentative for either the word joya (jewel), or joyo (an alternate spelling for hole, and Puerto Rican vulgar slang for anus)). The songs are then placed in heavy rotation as filler between sections (and, in the Puerto Rico broadcast of the show, to cover local New York radio spots that are irrelevant to the Puerto Rican market).

Some listeners have complained these musical parodies take more show time than warranted. The authors of most of these parodies, DJ Chucky who is now part of The Luis Jiménez Show and Gerpis Correa, also known as Shino/Aguakate.

The Miami Vacilón did their share of musical parodies, until the hosts Enrique and Joe left to Univision Radio. None of the new hosts capitalized on that aspect of the show, mostly for lack of production and talent. Both Enrique Santos and Joe Ferrero continued to produce phenomenal parodies which dealt with political satire, current events, making fun of people, and even the City of Hialeah (Second largest city in South Florida, mostly Cuban). The parody sung, written and performed by Enrique Santos, "Sweet Home Hialeah", has been one of their most famous, locally. The video was shot on location in the City of Hialeah and has almost become its emblem. The lyrics were sung to "Sweet Home Alabama" but with a twist. (See YouTube)

== News, straight and odd ==
Straight news are read and humorously discussed in the section called "Hablando Plepla" ("Talking Crap"; "Plepla" is a euphemism for feces, with less of a profane connotation than the more commonly used caca, or "shit").

The same is done for odd news in the section called Noticias Locas (Crazy News). Most are taken from the Odd News segment of Yahoo! News.

Francis Méndez reads regular news at the top of the hour (not the same as Hablando Plepla), but injecting humorous slang phrases to the headlines. This goes in sharp contrast to the serious, almost dead-panned delivery of the show's sports announcer, Cuban-born Renato Murphy, as well as that of Cadillo's traffic report. The result is almost as odd as the Noticias Locas segment itself.

== Open Lines ==
Lines are opened in a segment of the show for listeners to call in and tell their anecdotes, which are generally mishaps or sexual situations. Although many subject names are suggested, all calls wind up discussing the aforementioned situations. From Monday to Thursday, subjects are rotated, but the last two hours of Friday's show are devoted to randomly take calls on previous subjects, in the section called Lo Que Sobró de la Semana (What's Left of This Week).

Listeners' calls tend to have a somewhat stringent quality control:

- Tony Sánchez, the program's call screener, has to judge the story as funny enough to be put on air. Then the call is broadcast on air, so the hosts can talk to the caller. Usually each call is given approximately three minutes of air time. If the story is not funny enough (e.g., a weak punchline), or runs too long, the call is hung up to the tune of two different songs: A bolero parody which starts with the line Ay, Qué Historia Más Pendeja (Ugh, What a Stupid Story) for unfunny calls, and a "Charge" tune instrumentalized with the syllable "blah" for long calls.
- If callers start giving too much praise to Juan and Moonshadow, the cast will start singing a Puerto Rican bomba which starts Es Un Lambón (He's A Kiss-up)
- If the hosts judge a story as over-the-top, or an outright fabrication, the cast will start chanting Embustero, Embustero... (Liar, Liar...)
- If Tony Sánchez's judgement about a call produces a flat or otherwise uninteresting call, Jiménez chastises him on the air and physically strikes him (or so it seems). Many callers complain that Sánchez's judgement depends on his mood, on how well the anecdote is explained to him, or on the caller's gender. Tony Sánchez is considered a traitor by most of the audience since he and the rest of the "mequetrefes" betrayed Luis Jiménez and stole his show.

== Discography ==
- 2001- Tortilla Party
- 2002- Vacilón 69
- 2003- Chant for Neta
- 2005- Sinñematográfico (Soundtrack)
- 2007- El Vacilón The Movie (DVD)
