= Egghead (disambiguation) =

Egghead is an anti-intellectual epithet.

Egghead may also refer to:

== Fictional characters ==
- "Egghead", the nickname of Sonic's nemesis, Doctor Eggman
- Egghead (DC Comics)
- Egghead (Marvel Comics)
- Egghead (Looney Tunes)
- Egghead Jr., a Looney Tunes character

== Television ==
- Eggheads (game show), a British quiz show
- "Eggheads", the eighth Sonic Boom episode
- "Eggheads" (Sliders), an episode of the TV show Sliders

== Other ==
- Manolo the Egghead, a famous series of prank phone calls
- Egghead, a fictional location in One Piece
- Egghead Software, a technology company based in Bellevue WA, USA
- Egghead: Or, You Can't Survive on Ideas Alone, a poetry book by Bo Burnham
- The Egghead, Canadian literary award for comics
- Eggheads, a series of public art sculptures by Robert Arneson
