= Arcilla =

Arcilla is a surname. Notable people with this surname include:

- Francisco Arcilla (born 1984), Spanish racewalker
- Jay Arcilla (born 1996), Filipino actor
- John Arcilla (born 1966), Filipino actor
- Johnny Arcilla (born 1980), Filipino tennis player

== See also ==
- Arlene B. Arcillas (born 1969), Filipino mayor
- Arcillas de Morella Formation, a geological formation in Spain
- Arcila (surname)
- Archila
