= Tuluá =

- Municipality and city
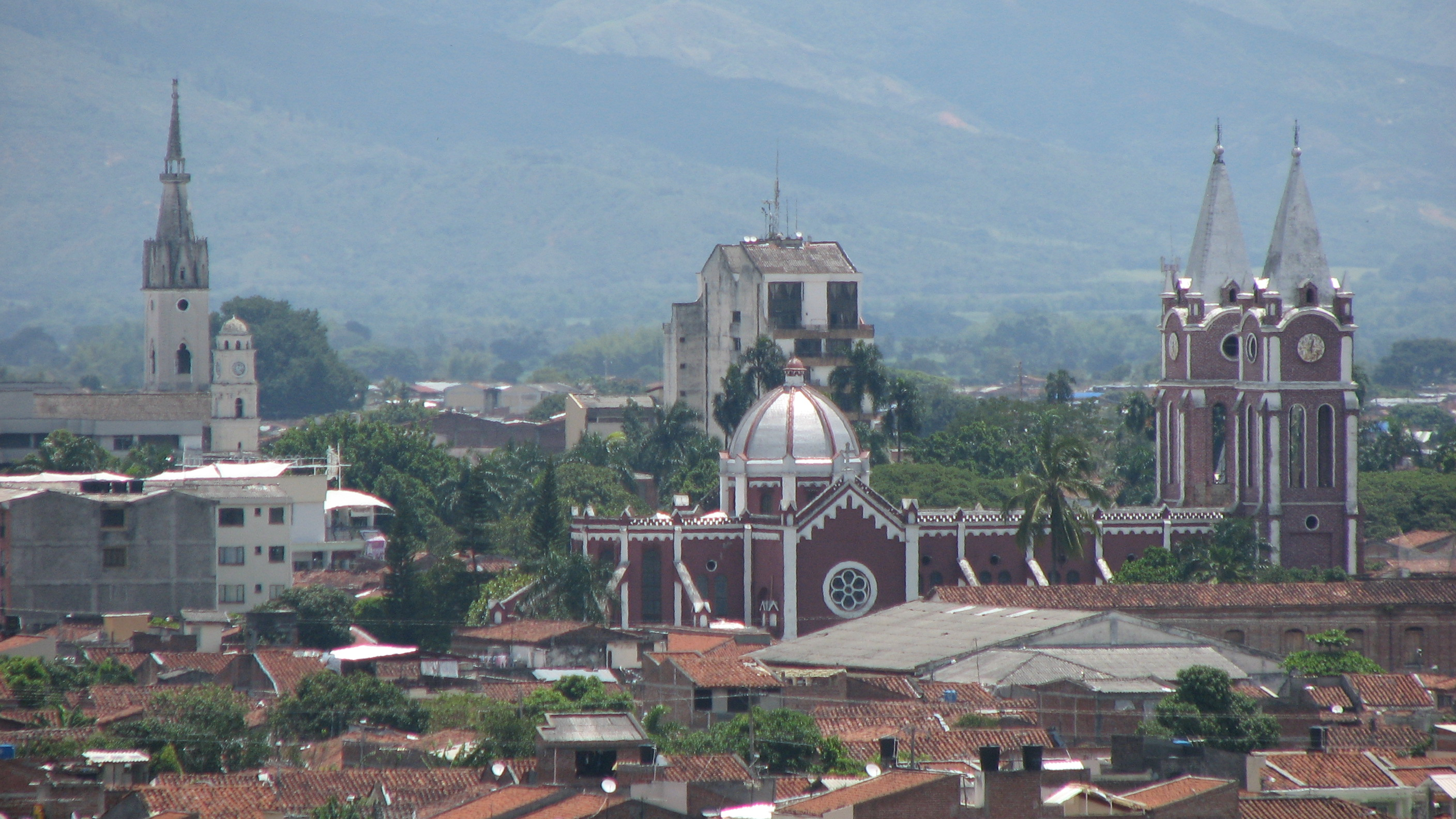
- Tuluá in May 2008

- Flag Coat of arms

- Location of the municipality and town of Tuluá in the Valle del Cauca Department of Colombia.

- Location in Colombia
- Coordinates: 4°05′N 76°12′W
- Country: Colombia
- Department: Valle del Cauca Department
- Founded: 1639

Government
  - Mayor: John Jairo Gomez Aguirre (2019-2023)

Area
  - Municipality and city: 909.4 km^{2} (351.1 sq mi)
  - Urban: 16.05 km^{2} (6.20 sq mi)
- Elevation: 960 m (3,150 ft)

Population (2020 est.)
  - Municipality and city: 218,812
  - Density: 240.6/km^{2} (623.2/sq mi)
  - Urban: 178,030
  - Urban density: 11,090/km^{2} (28,730/sq mi)
- Demonym: Tulueño
- Time zone: UTC-5 (Colombia Standard Time)
- Area code: 57 + 2
- Website: Official website (in Spanish)

Tuluá (Spanish pronunciation: [tuˈlwa]), is a city located in the heart of Valle del Cauca, Colombia. A major industrial and commercial center, it is the region's fourth-largest city after Cali—the department capital—Palmira and Buenaventura. Founded around 1741 by Juan de Lemos y Aguirre, it has a population of approximately 178,000. It is also known as the Corazón del Valle (meaning 'The Heart of Valle'), as La Villa de Céspedes ('Town of Céspedes', named after the naturalist Juan María Céspedes) and Tierra Fácil ('Easy Land' in the native language).

It is well known throughout Colombia and many parts of South America as a major center of salsa dancing.

== Geography ==
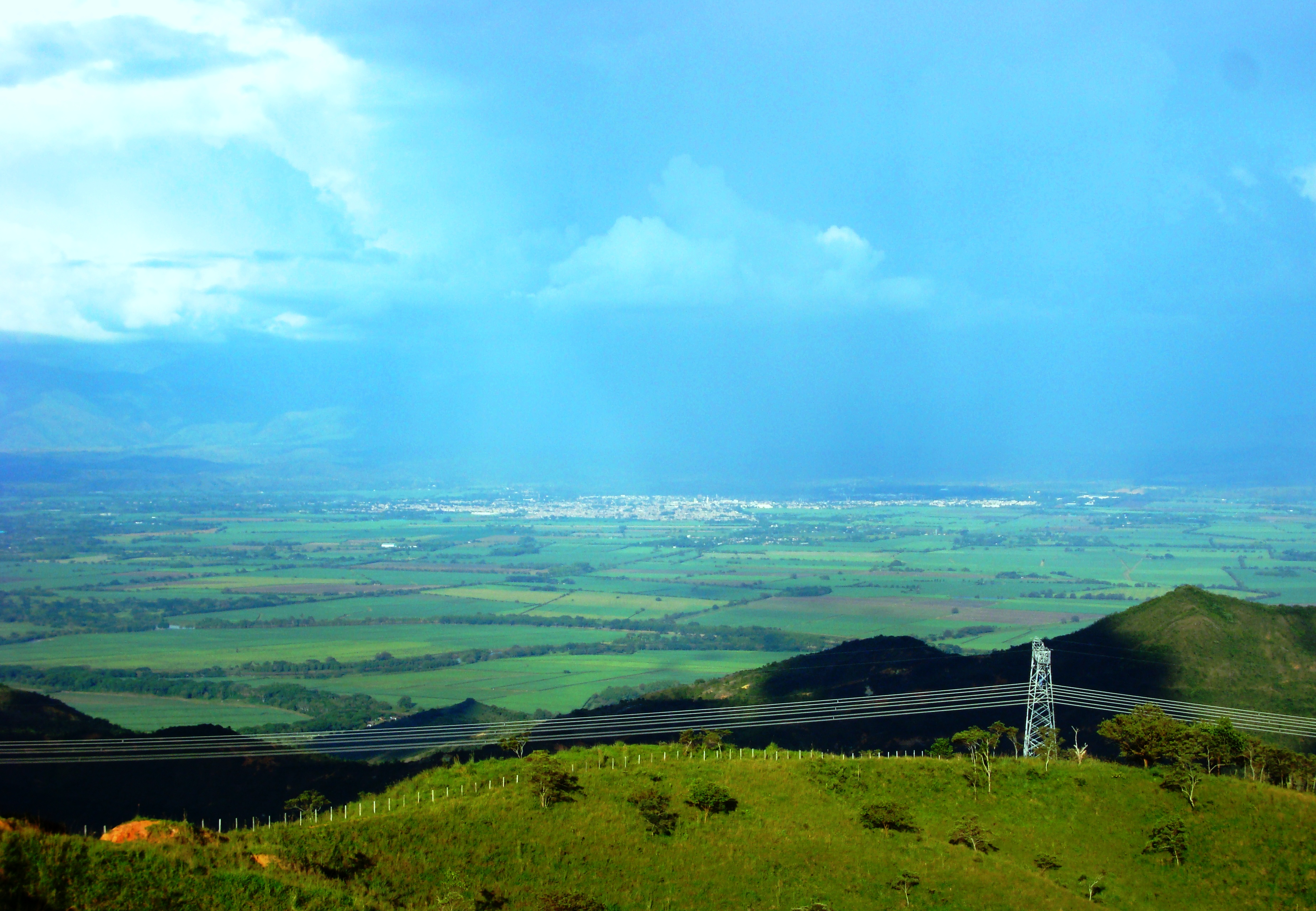
Landscape in Tuluá.

The Tuluá River runs through Tuluá's urban area. The city is located 269 miles from Bogotá, the capital of Colombia, 63 miles northeast of Cali and 108 miles from the important harbor city of Buenaventura, which lies on the coast of the Pacific Ocean. Although it has a relatively small urban area, Tuluá's metropolitan area is comparatively big. The city lies between the two westernmost cordilleras of Colombia, about 50 miles east of Buenaventura.

=== Climate ===
Located just three degrees north of the equator, Tuluá has a tropical rainforest climate (Af in the Köppen climate classification). It has hot, sunny days usually in the high 20s and low 30s, punctuated by intense storms. Night temperatures are on average in the high teens. A lot of different vegetables and fruit are grown in Tuluá.

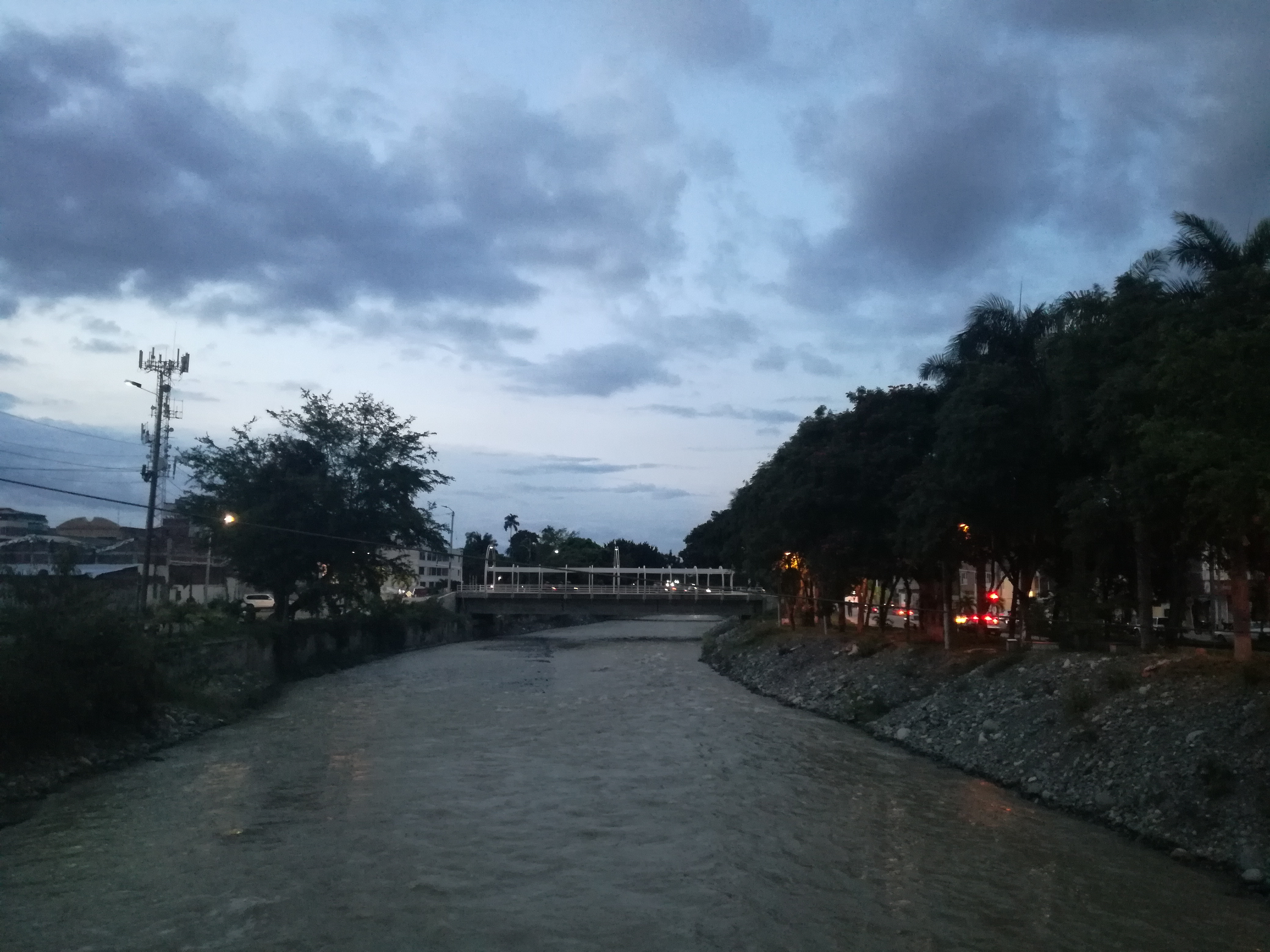
Tuluá River

Climate data for Tuluá (Heriberto Gíl Martínez Airport), elevation 955 m (3,133 ft), (1981–2010)
Month	Jan	Feb	Mar	Apr	May	Jun	Jul	Aug	Sep	Oct	Nov	Dec	Year
Mean daily maximum °C (°F)	30.2 (86.4)	30.6 (87.1)	30.5 (86.9)	29.7 (85.5)	29.4 (84.9)	29.6 (85.3)	30.3 (86.5)	30.8 (87.4)	30.2 (86.4)	29.3 (84.7)	29.0 (84.2)	29.4 (84.9)	29.9 (85.8)
Daily mean °C (°F)	24.1 (75.4)	24.3 (75.7)	24.3 (75.7)	23.9 (75.0)	23.8 (74.8)	23.7 (74.7)	24.1 (75.4)	24.2 (75.6)	24.0 (75.2)	23.4 (74.1)	23.1 (73.6)	23.5 (74.3)	23.9 (75.0)
Mean daily minimum °C (°F)	18.4 (65.1)	18.6 (65.5)	18.8 (65.8)	18.9 (66.0)	18.8 (65.8)	18.5 (65.3)	17.9 (64.2)	18.1 (64.6)	18.3 (64.9)	18.4 (65.1)	18.4 (65.1)	18.4 (65.1)	18.5 (65.3)
Average precipitation mm (inches)	80.7 (3.18)	85.9 (3.38)	146.7 (5.78)	156.1 (6.15)	135.3 (5.33)	82.8 (3.26)	61.9 (2.44)	60.3 (2.37)	108.5 (4.27)	156.1 (6.15)	140.6 (5.54)	87.3 (3.44)	1,302.1 (51.26)
Average precipitation days	12	12	16	18	18	14	12	11	14	19	18	14	174
Average relative humidity (%)	76	76	76	80	81	81	77	75	77	79	80	79	78
Source: Instituto de Hidrologia Meteorologia y Estudios Ambientales

Climate data for Mateguadua, Tuluá, elevation 1,025 m (3,363 ft), (1981–2010)
Month	Jan	Feb	Mar	Apr	May	Jun	Jul	Aug	Sep	Oct	Nov	Dec	Year
Mean daily maximum °C (°F)	29.4 (84.9)	29.8 (85.6)	29.6 (85.3)	29.4 (84.9)	29.3 (84.7)	29.3 (84.7)	29.7 (85.5)	30.2 (86.4)	29.9 (85.8)	29.3 (84.7)	29.0 (84.2)	29.2 (84.6)	29.5 (85.1)
Daily mean °C (°F)	22.6 (72.7)	22.8 (73.0)	22.7 (72.9)	22.6 (72.7)	22.5 (72.5)	22.6 (72.7)	22.7 (72.9)	23.1 (73.6)	22.7 (72.9)	22.3 (72.1)	22.2 (72.0)	22.3 (72.1)	22.6 (72.7)
Mean daily minimum °C (°F)	17.3 (63.1)	17.4 (63.3)	17.5 (63.5)	17.7 (63.9)	17.7 (63.9)	17.6 (63.7)	17.3 (63.1)	17.4 (63.3)	17.3 (63.1)	17.3 (63.1)	17.2 (63.0)	17.3 (63.1)	17.4 (63.3)
Average precipitation mm (inches)	94.5 (3.72)	93.7 (3.69)	148.0 (5.83)	160.8 (6.33)	112.3 (4.42)	64.6 (2.54)	47.3 (1.86)	56.9 (2.24)	127.4 (5.02)	163.1 (6.42)	145.1 (5.71)	101.0 (3.98)	1,297.1 (51.07)
Average precipitation days	12	11	16	17	16	12	11	10	14	18	17	13	165
Average relative humidity (%)	81	80	81	83	84	83	81	80	81	82	83	83	82
Source: Instituto de Hidrologia Meteorologia y Estudios Ambientales

Climate data for Barragan, Tuluá, elevation 2,902 m (9,521 ft), (1981–2010)
Month	Jan	Feb	Mar	Apr	May	Jun	Jul	Aug	Sep	Oct	Nov	Dec	Year
Mean daily maximum °C (°F)	16.1 (61.0)	16.2 (61.2)	16.4 (61.5)	16.4 (61.5)	16.4 (61.5)	16.2 (61.2)	15.7 (60.3)	15.9 (60.6)	16.2 (61.2)	15.8 (60.4)	15.7 (60.3)	15.7 (60.3)	16 (61)
Daily mean °C (°F)	11.7 (53.1)	11.8 (53.2)	11.9 (53.4)	12.0 (53.6)	12.2 (54.0)	12.0 (53.6)	11.7 (53.1)	11.8 (53.2)	11.7 (53.1)	11.4 (52.5)	11.3 (52.3)	11.5 (52.7)	11.7 (53.1)
Mean daily minimum °C (°F)	7.2 (45.0)	7.4 (45.3)	7.4 (45.3)	7.8 (46.0)	8.0 (46.4)	8.0 (46.4)	7.7 (45.9)	7.7 (45.9)	7.5 (45.5)	7.5 (45.5)	7.4 (45.3)	7.4 (45.3)	7.6 (45.7)
Average precipitation mm (inches)	76.0 (2.99)	68.7 (2.70)	99.4 (3.91)	108.8 (4.28)	98.4 (3.87)	47.3 (1.86)	34.1 (1.34)	38.3 (1.51)	61.4 (2.42)	141.2 (5.56)	129.6 (5.10)	88.1 (3.47)	975.1 (38.39)
Average precipitation days	11	11	15	16	17	13	10	11	11	18	19	15	165
Average relative humidity (%)	85	83	84	84	83	82	82	82	81	85	87	86	84
Source: Instituto de Hidrologia Meteorologia y Estudios Ambientales

== Crime ==
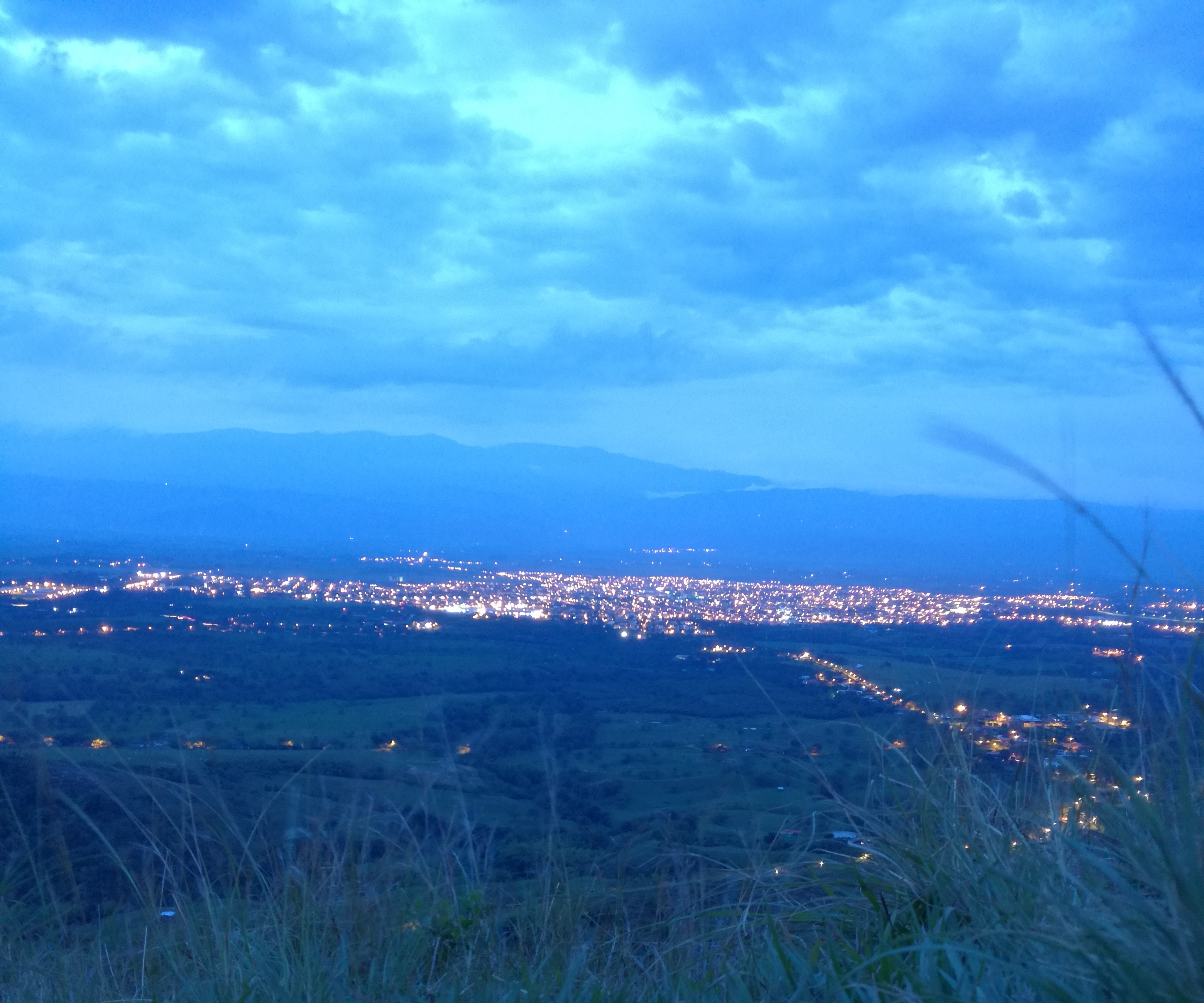
Tuluá in the night

Tuluá has high crime rates. The surge in murders is allegedly due to rivaling paramilitary gangs Los Urabeños and Los Rastrojos fighting for control of the city's lucrative drug trade. In 2022, over 50 people were killed by a prison riot.

== Education ==
The University of Valle has a branch campus in Tuluá. The main campus is based in Cali, the department's capital. UCEVA (the Central University of Valle del Cauca) has its main campus in the city.

== Transportation ==
The closest airport is Cali's international airport—which in fact is in Palmira—Alfonso Bonilla Aragón International Airport (CLO) or Palmaseca. Sixteen airlines provide service for the airport, including American Airlines, Avianca (Colombia's largest airline and flag carrier) and Avianca Cargp. Tuluá also has a regional airport, Heriberto Gíl Martínez Airport (ULQ).

== Places of interest ==
Botanical garden (Jardin Botánico) called Juan María Céspedes in Mateguadua village. Chillicote lake is famous for its herons. The soccer stadium 12 de Octubre has a capacity of 17,000. It is used by the local soccer team Cortuluá, which plays in the Colombian first division.

Lago Chillicote is named after Chillicothe, Ohio a former sister city of Tuluá

Guadua Park (Parque de la Guadua) Bamboo and heliconias (plants often mistaken for birds-of-paradise), nature trails, a waterfall, and natural pools of warm water are some of the attractions at the Guillermo Ponce de León Paris Guadua Park in Tuluá. This 12.5-acre site is overflowing with greenery; visitors can also enjoy a large playground with their children. Sarmiento Lora Park (Parque Sarmiento Lora) It offers a great kiddie pool (complete with little water slides) and adult pool area, restaurant, shelters and play area. Civic Plaza Boyaca (Plaza Civica Boyaca)

The Tuluá Festival (Feria de Tuluá) takes place every June in the second or third week. Music plays an important role with bands, artists and singers performing. A music performance is held every night.

== Notable people ==
- Gustavo Álvarez Gardeazábal, writer
- Carlos Alzate, cyclist
- Edmundo Arias, musician
- Faustino Hernán Asprilla, football player
- Jonathan Cuenú, football player
- Vicky Hernandez, actress
- Diego Salazar, Olympic weightlifting medal winner
- Gabriel Velasco, politician
- Jhon Arcila, football player
