= Isabel Gómez-Bassols =

American writer

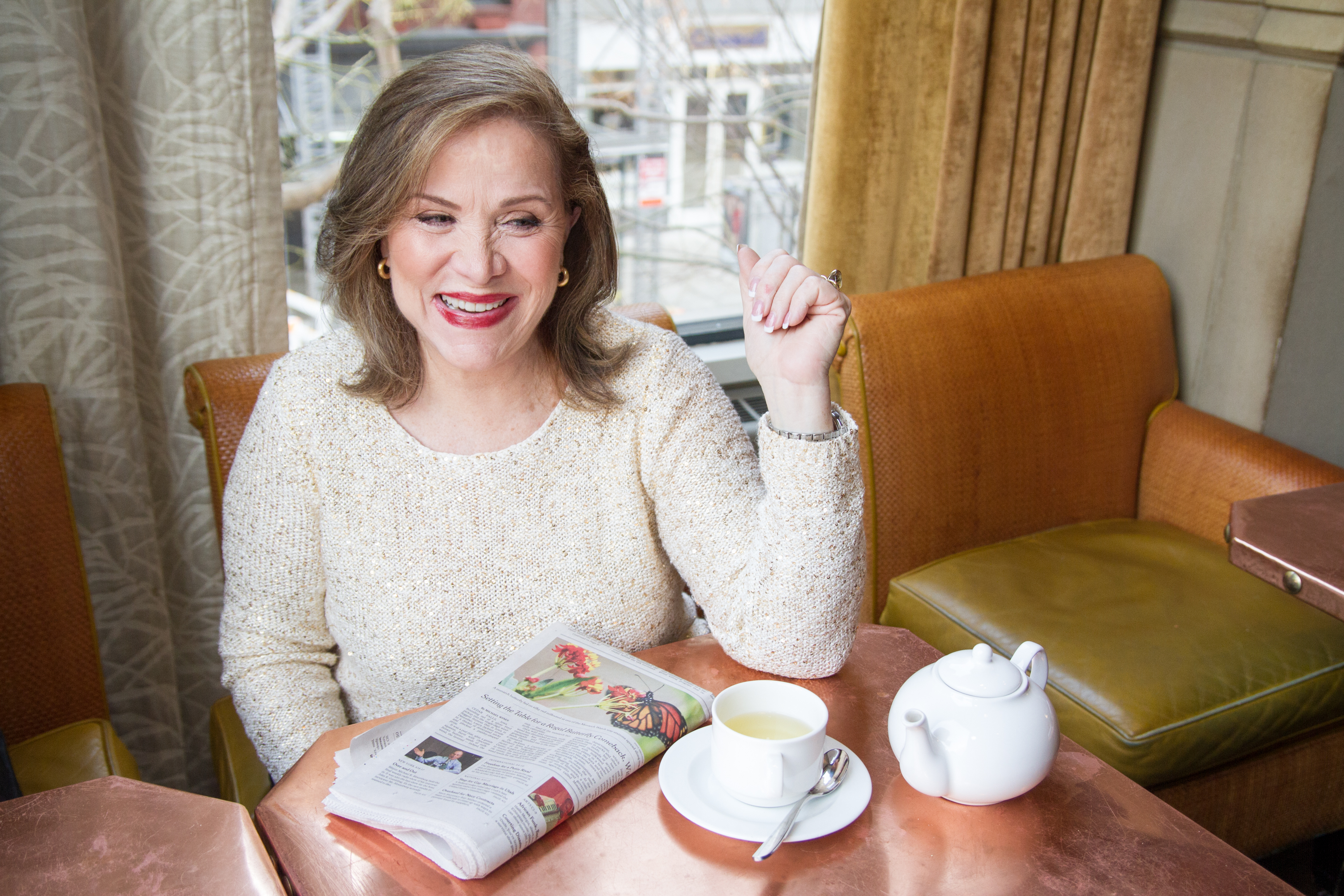
Isabel Gómez-Bassols

Isabel Gómez-Bassols is a psychologist, writer, and broadcaster in the United States. She is a radio talk show host on Univisión's nationwide Spanish-language radio network, and also appears regularly on television.

== Career ==
Gómez-Bassols was born in Cuba; she has lived in Miami for most of her life. She has postgraduate degrees in education, psychology and psychological diagnosis. She worked as a schoolteacher, and later as a psychologist, for the public school system of Miami-Dade County, where she became head of the psychological services department. She has written five self-help books and two children's books.

Gómez-Bassols has hosted a nationwide daily talk show, Dra. Isabel, since 1998, beginning on Radio Unica. The show has been broadcast by Univision Radio since 2004. On television, she has made regular appearances as a commentator on Cristina and Sábado Gigante, and she has her own weekly television show as well. In 2002 Gómez-Bassols performed as herself (Doctora Isabel) in five episodes of The Bold and the Beautiful.

In January 2008, Dr. Isabel Gómez-Bassols participated in "Seminarios Puedes Llegar" ("You Can Reach" Seminars) created by Alberto Sardinas. Several celebrities from the Hispanic media and the world of self-help participated during its first run in, including Dr. Nancy Alvarez (psychologist) and Felipe Viel.
