= Manolo Cabeza de Huevo =

Spanish-language abusive prank calls in a New York radio show

"Manolo Cabeza de Huevo" (Spanish for "Manolo the Egg head", although interpreted as "Manolo the Testicle head") is a series of famous Spanish-language abusive prank calls made by the New York radio show El Vacilón de la Mañana (Spanish for The Morning Party).

The original set consisted in three prank calls; in these, the presenter of the show (which itself is known for making prank calls of this nature), called a person named Manuel (original for Manolo), a superintendent of a New York City building. After calling Manuel, "Manolo Cabeza de Huevo", Manolo would react angrily and insult the caller. The harassment calls were presented in the show and uploaded to the Internet.

The popularity of the prank calls was so high that El Vacilón eventually did more set of prank calls, which were again presented and uploaded. The prank calls sets were topics of discussion in many Internet blogs and forums; some users even elaborated Adobe Flash animations to depict Manolo's reaction to the calls. The sets have since become an Internet phenomenon, and have received a small cult following. The calls themselves also appeared on the discs that El Vacilón made (Vacilon 69, Tortilla Party, Luis y Moon's Chant for Neta, and SinÑEMA TóGRAFICO).

== Original set ==
The original set consisted in three prank calls (although they may have been edited, and presented this way):

- In the first one, the radio presenter of "El Vacilón" (pretending to be a tenant of an apartment of the building), called Manolo and informed him of a broken pipe. After Manolo agreed to check the pipe the next day, the caller thanked him calling him "Manolo Cabeza de Huevo". Manolo reacted angrily to this nickname, but the caller justified himself saying that everybody in the building called him that, and that he actually believed that it was Manolo's real last name. After the caller started shouting "Cabeza de Huevo!" several times, Manolo insulted him and finished the call.
- The second one continued where the first one left off; the caller insisted that everybody called Manolo "Cabeza de Huevo". After calling him that repeatedly, Manolo threatened of cutting the caller's head in half if he continued calling him like that. The caller said that Manolo's head itself was cut in half, like a penis, so Manolo hung up again.
- In the third and final call, the radio presenter insisted that Manolo should fix his pipe, but Manolo was so angry that he continuously insulted the caller. After revealing that it was a prank call for the show, Manolo insulted a final time and hung up the phone.

== Second set ==
The second set occurred some unspecified time later. In this call, two callers from El Vacilón act as Milly and Hector, a supposed married couple. This set consists in five prank calls:

- In the first one, "Milly" called Manolo, and told him to come over to her department and fix her toilet (she also mentioned that they spoke a week before). In the middle of the call, "Hector" arrived and discussed with Milly, accusing her of cheating him. He took the phone and insulted Manolo, telling him that every woman of the building said that he wanted to have sex with them. After insulting Manolo once more, Manolo lost his temper, insulted him, and hung up the phone.
- The second call was apparently a few minutes later, since Manolo was still angry. In this call, "Milly" called him and apologized for the behavior of her husband. Manolo threatened her of "cutting his husband in twenty pieces", and she told him not to behave like that. He threatened her husband again, and hung up the phone.
- In the third call, "Hector" called. He apologized with Manolo after supposedly having talked with her wife. Manolo insulted him and told him he didn't accept his apologies, and hung up.
- In the fourth call, "Hector" called again, telling Manolo that he was an animal since he just wanted to say he was sorry. Manolo insulted him again, and Hector said that this may be the reason why everybody called him "Manolo Cabeza de Huevo". Manolo lost his temper, insulted him various times, and hung up the phone.
- In the next and final call, Manolo was so angry that he kept insulting "Hector". He told him that it was a joke from El Vacilón all along, and Manolo insulted them, asking them why they didn't have any respect for people.

In this set, and the next ones, Manolo's voice and pronunciation is somewhat different, compared to the first set. This has led some users to think that the calls may be acted and not real.

== Third set ==
The third set of the series, the most popular one, was dubbed "Soy tu ano" ("I'm your anus"). Instead of consisting in various calls about fixing pipes, the caller told Manolo that he was Manolo's anus. The set consists of the next calls:

- In the first one, the caller (apparently who provided the voice for "Hector" in the second set) said to Manolo that he was his anus. After understanding what he meant, Manolo quickly insulted him and dismissed the call.
- In the second one, the caller made a high-pitched voice and told the same thing to Manolo. Manolo tried to speak with him, but the caller just kept saying "I'm your anus" and making fart noises. Manolo tried to explain that he had work to do, but the caller kept saying the same things. Manolo told him in the end that he was a hairy anus, and hung up.
- In the third one, after Manolo answered, the caller just said "Manolo" with a high-pitched voice again. Manolo quickly recognized him and began to cry, saying that his last piece of patience was already gone; the caller made a fart noise again and Manolo insulted him a final time and hung up.
- In the fourth one, the caller spoke with a normal voice. He told Manolo to fix his pipe. Manolo, trying to relax by an overforced breathing, asked him in which floor the caller lived. The caller responded, "in the back one". After Manolo demanded an explanation of which floor he meant, since the building has only a backyard in the back, the caller said "in the one of your ass" (quietly laughing). Manolo insulted him again, and hung up.
- In the fifth one, the caller, again with a high-pitched voice, just said "Cabeza de Huevo!". Manolo immediately started insulting the caller, his mother, his grandmother, his father, and all his descendants, crying in despair. After that he hung up.
- In the sixth and final one, the caller, one more time with a high-pitched voice, said he was Manolo's anus. Manolo insulted him, telling the caller he didn't have a mother. The caller said that it was again a joke from El Vacilón, and Manolo insulted the caller's mother, and then he hung up.

When the prank call was uploaded to the internet, it contained a reggaeton 16-second intro, which contained the words "Manolo Cabeza de Huevo" and Manolo's insults, all taken from the second set.

== Fourth set ==
The fourth set of prank calls to Manolo was not as popular as the first three. The original "plan" for the prank call was to make Manolo think that the caller was his son, Israel saying that he had been thrown in jail. However, Manolo quickly noticed that the caller wasn't his son, so the call and the next ones were different, unconnected jokes.

- In the first call, the caller El Vacilón called him and told Manolo that he was Israel, his son, and that he was in jail. Manolo realized that the caller wasn't his son, so demanded to know who was speaking. The caller replied "The one who ate your little ass", with a high-pitched voice (a likely reference to the third set). Manolo quickly insulted him and hung up.
- In the second call, the caller didn't say anything, but just breathed heavily. Manolo stayed quiet, also saying nothing. The caller then asked, "You keep quiet, huh, you old queer?". Manolo replied that he thought the caller was the caller's mother, which led to him masturbating, and then hung up.
- In the third call, the caller said that he was from a grocery store, saying that Manolo's son, Israel, had a huge debt of money. Manolo quickly lost his patience, demanding to speak with "Don Hector". The caller said that Hector wasn't around, but he could talk with him. Manolo told him that he spoke only with the "owner of the circus, not the animals," making the caller laugh, so Manolo realized it was a joke again, so he insulted him and hung up.
- In the fourth call, the caller said that he was from a laundry, saying that Manolo hadn't picked up his shirt. Manolo replied that he never left a shirt there, so the caller said that the shirt had his name. When Manolo demanded to know what name was printed, the caller said "Manolo Cabeza de Huevo". Manolo, realizing it was a joke, told him that he was "starting" to fall for it. The caller then said that he was going to use the hanger as an antenna, so Manolo told him to straighten it up and put it in the caller's butt, asking if the caller "felt pleasure from something so thin". Then he hung up.
- In the fifth call, the caller, with a hoarse voice, asked for Manolo. However, he quickly realized that it was from El Vacilón again, so he started to scream at him. The caller, trying to stay in character, asked "What's going on?", but Manolo continued to scream, saying that he didn't want to be bothered again in his "damned life". After some last insults, he hung up.

The fourth set was named "Mission Number 34". The prank calls contained an intro that announced this, saying that they were going to pose for his son, Israel. Even though it was presented in the segment Caíste (You Fell For It), Manolo never fell for it, since he always noticed that they were prank calls.

== Fifth set ==
The fourth and the fifth set are often confused about the order in which they were made. This set wasn't as popular as rest. Also, instead of being a specific joke, the calls have little or no relation between one and another.

- In the first call, Rubén, from El Vacilón (who made the first set), called Manolo and spoke in English. However, since Manolo had difficulties speaking in English he asked the caller to speak slowly. The caller then identified himself as a building inspector, and said that they have to inspect the building because the windows were broken. Manolo started laughing, saying it was ridiculous, and quickly tried to dismiss the caller. The caller called Manolo a "cranky old man", which Manolo replied angrily, saying to repeat it. The caller then said "I'll say it in Spanish: ¡Cabeza 'e huevo!". Manolo realized it was the people from El Vacilón calling and insulted them, saying he will not fall for it again, and hung up.
- In the short, second call, they call Manolo again, this time the caller asking for "Mama". When Manolo asked, "Which Mama?", the caller replied, "Ma-Manolo cabeza de Huevo!". Manolo lost his patience, saying that the devil should go out and take him, and hung up.
- In the third call, Manolo didn't answer, but his son, Israel, did. He said that Manolo wasn't around, but Rubén said that he was from El Vacilón. Israel then explained that Manolo was there but he didn't want to answer, but Rubén persuaded him, telling him to tell Manolo he was someone for a job. Manolo took the phone, and the caller said that he was looking for a job. Manolo quickly told him that there wasn't a job for him, so the caller told him that he was a handyman. When asked what a handyman was, the caller said that he was someone who made reparations, and Manolo told him that the caller was stupid. The caller asked why he was called like that, and Manolo answered that he was the one who repaired things in the building, so the caller told him that Manolo was too old anyway to work there. Manolo insulted him, so the caller insulted him back, making Manolo say that the caller's name was "Coñazo" (great cunt). The caller said that Manolo's name was "Manolo Cabeza de Huevo," so Manolo dropped the phone, realizing that they were from El Vacilón again. Through the phone, it could be heard Manolo's yelling to Israel, insulting him about passing him the phone. Israel said that they told him that they were someone for a job, but Manolo told him that "it was the same people... I know them!". Israel grabbed the phone, saying that he was in trouble now, and he hung up.
- In the fourth call, an angry Manolo answered the phone, and the people from El Vacilón started to sing a Mexican Ranchera song with lyrics about Manolo Cabeza de Huevo. When the short song ended, they asked Manolo about a song to sing. Manolo insulted them, but they kept laughing, so Manolo insulted them again and he hung up.
- In the fifth and final call, Rubén called Manolo again, saying it had all been prank calls from Caiste, and asking him for his permission to put them on the air. Manolo answered by telling them to do whatever they wanted, and insulted them even more so they could have more material to work with.

== Cultural impact ==
"Manolo Cabeza de Huevo" is one of the most known and recognizable prank calls that have been made, particularly in Latin American countries. Many videos about the prank calls have been published online. Users have made Adobe Flash animations to represent Manolo's reactions of the calls.
