= Jonathan Cuenú =

Colombian footballer (born 1986)

Personal information
- Full name: Jonathan Rodríguez Cuenú
- Date of birth: November 7, 1986 (age 39)
- Place of birth: Tuluá, Valle, Colombia
- Height: 1.82 m (6 ft 0 in)
- Position: Forward

Senior career*
Years	Team	Apps	(Gls)
2005–2007	Atlético Huila		
2007	FAS		
2008–2012	Alianza Atlético		
2013–	La Paz		
- * Club domestic league appearances and goals

Jonathan Rodríguez Cuenú (born November 7, 1986) is a Colombian footballer who currently plays for the Bolivian club La Paz.

== See also ==
- Football in Colombia
- List of football clubs in Colombia
