= Diana Franco =

Colombian model and actress

- Born: Diana Franco; Cali, Valle, Colombia
- Occupation(s): Actress, anchor, producer, script writer
- Years active: 1988–present
- Website: www.dianafranco.com

Diana Franco is a Colombian model and actress. She was born in Cali, Colombia, and in 1982 moved to New York City, where she lived and studied. In 1988, in a nationwide televised competition, Franco was crowned Miss Colombia USA. Franco became a TV commercial and editorial model and in December 1990 appeared on her first cover of Cosmopolitan en Español. In Peru, La Modelo Latina Pageant 1991 awarded her La Silueta Diet-Coke title. In 1992, Franco was approached to participate in Buscando Estrellas Con Budweiser, the Spanish-version of Star Search, where – once again – she won first place. Later that same year, Cover Girl Make-Up chose her to be one of the faces for their TV campaigns for the Hispanic market alongside of Barbara Palacios (Miss Universe 1986).

After traveling and working around the world, including places such as Taipei, Istanbul and Hong Kong, Franco decided to stay in the U.S. to pursue her acting career in her native language. In 1992 Salvese Quien Pueda (SQP), a weekly comedy show that aired on the Telemundo Network, made her part of their regular cast. In SQP she developed and often played Vicky Bikini, a girl who always did her errands wearing only a bikini, high heels and a handbag so she would never have to make a line. Vicky Bikini soon became one of the shows most requested characters.

In 1995, Univision Network hired Franco as the female VJ for Caliente, one of its most widely seen weekend TV shows. Caliente gave Franco the opportunity to interact with her young Latino audience while traveling to exotic beaches around the world. Two years later, Franco was asked to be part of Edición Especial (Telemundo Network), which earned her the anchor star status in the Spanish market. She was also in charge of hosting most of Telemundo's specials for the network. In 1998, she landed the role of Sylvia La Rosen in Safe Harbor (Aaron Spelling) which aired on the WB Network. Glamour en Español magazine recognized her with the Most Glamorous Woman Award 1998 and in 1999 People en Español placed Franco as one of the "25 Most Beautiful People" along with faces such as Salma Hayek and Ricky Martin.

In 2002, Franco traveled back to her native Colombia to portray Sandra, a cocaine manufacturer in the soap opera El Precio del Silencio (Telefutura Network). In October 2006, Franco had the opportunity to be part of the very-selected cast of the short film Marrying God (AFI), where she played Maricela, the single mother of Lola played by Ashlyn Sanchez (Crash) and Ivy played by Alexa Vega (Spy Kids). Franco has also developed the "Life Style Specialist" title, and is often featured in US Spanish TV station across the nation.

In Pecados Ajenos, a Telemundo Studios production, Franco played Lola, the cellmate of Natalia – played by Lorena Rojas – and later, Oficial Joyer, in El Rostro de Analía alongside of Elizabeth Gutiérrez.

At the end of 2009, Franco was called to play Berta, a lonely bitter architect designer in the new version of Perro Amor, but due to a skiing accident, where she suffered several fractures, her role was eventually withdrawn. It took her several months to recuperate from her injuries.

In 2010, Franco became part of the selected cast of the new version of the Chilean soap opera Alguien Te Mira (2010), produced this time by Telemundo Television Studios in the USA. Franco portrays Dolores "Lola" Morandé, a housewife who has everything under control, except a couple of pounds of over weight, until she meets a very troubled woman that is determined to make her life miserable and hopes one day to take her place as the wife of her perfect husband.

== Filmography ==
Year	Title	Role	Notes
1988	Miss Colombia USA 1988	Herself	Beauty Pageant Winner
1989	Miss Model Of The World	Herself	Beauty/Modeling Contest; Finalist
1992	A Que No Te Atreves	Host	
1992	Salvese Quien Pueda	Main Cast	
1992	Latin Model Pageant	Herself	Modeling Contest; 3rd Place; Best Figure Title
1992	Buscando Estrellas con Budweiser	Herself	
1995–1998	Caliente	Host	
1996	El Show De Cristina	Herself	Guest Appearance
1998–2001	Edicion Especial	Anchor	
1998	El Show De Sevsec	Herself	Guest Appearance
1999	Safe Harbor	Syvia Larosen	
2000	Ritmo Latino Music Awards	Host	
2001	Padre Alberto	Herself	Guest Appearance
2002	Escandalo TV	Herself	Guest Appearance
2002	El Precio Del Silencio	Sandra	
2006	Marrying God	Maricela	
2007	Tambien Caeras	Herself	Guest Appearance
2008	Al Rojo Vivo Fin De Semana: Con Candela Ferro	Herself	Entertainment Anchor
2008	Pecados Ajenos	Lola	
2009	El Rostro de Analía	Officer Joyer	
2009–2010	Perro Amor	Berta	
2010	Los Implicados	Herself	Guest Appearance
2010	Alguien Te Mira (2010)	Lola	Main Cast
2013	Marido En Alquiler	Abogada	Guest Appearance
2013	En Otra Piel	Chantal	Guest Appearance
2013	Santa Diabla	Doctor	Guest Appearance
2015	Dueños del paraíso	Marina	Guest Appearance
2016	Bajo el mismo cielo	Prosecutor	Guest Appearance
2017	Mariposa de Barrio	Juez	Guest Appearance
2017	Milagros de Navidad	Gloria	Cast
