= Alberto Sardiñas =

American columnist (born 1978)

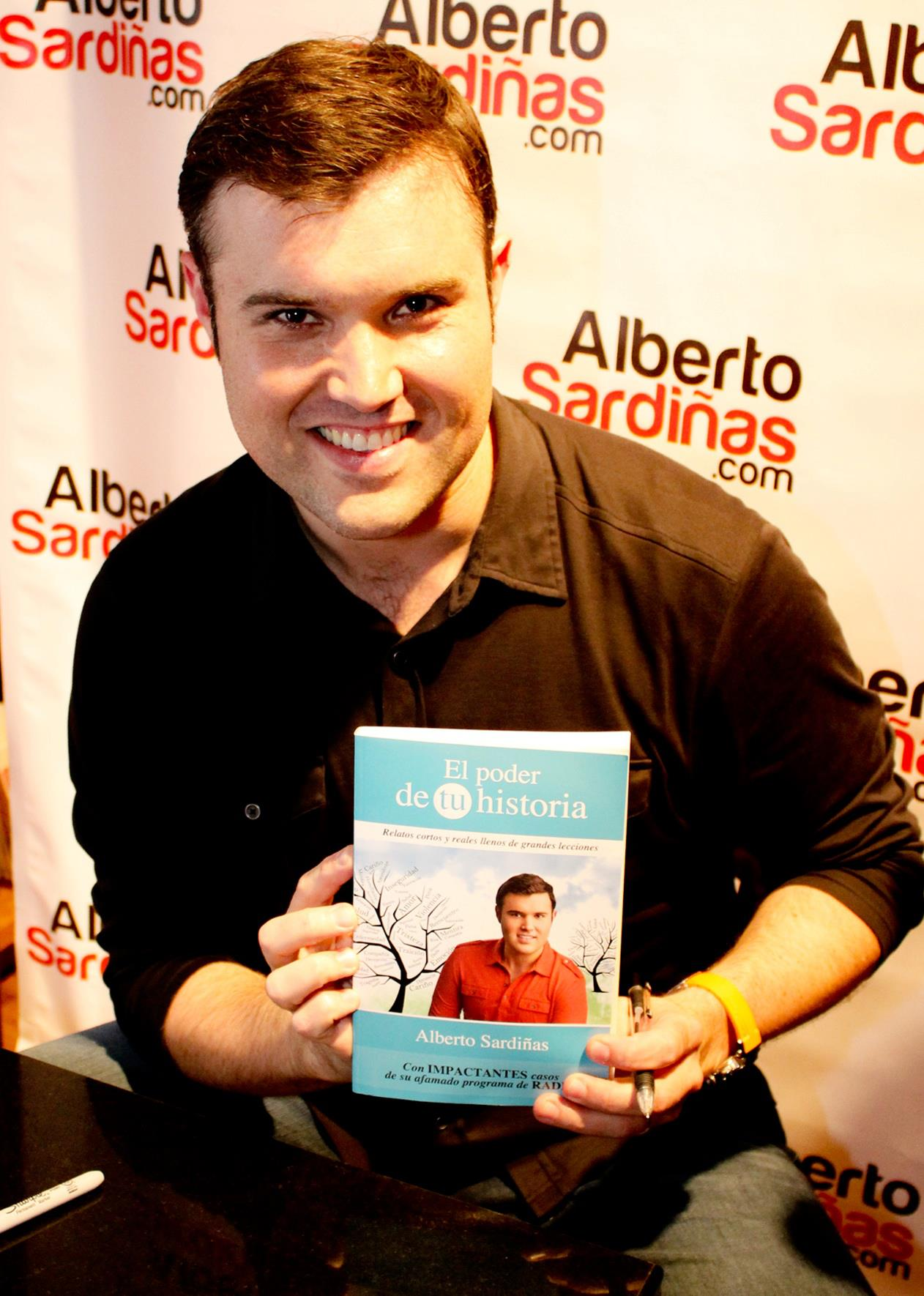
- Alberto in 2011
- Born: June 15, 1978 (age 48); Caracas, Venezuela
- Occupations: Radio host; Motivational speaker; Author
- Years active: 2000–present
- Spouse: Feigue Rosenfeld (m. 2011)
- Children: Sofia Sardiñas
- Website: www.albertosardinas.com

Alberto David Sardiñas Glottmann (born 1978) is a Venezuelan-American, Miami-based television host, radio host, podcaster, and online content creator. He is the host of El News Café, Univision's TV daily magazine on Univision Miami (WLTV). He is also known for hosting a midday show with music, news and giveaways on Miami's Amor 107.5 FM. He also hosts "Intimo", a weekend syndicated show focused on self-improvement and personal stories.

During his career, he has interviewed several celebrities and public figures including Jennifer Lopez, Celine Dion, Shakira, Author Don Miguel Ruiz, Senator Tim Kaine, Luis Fonsi, among others.

From June 2018 thru October 2021 he hosted the Passion Accomplished podcast, where he interviews entrepreneurs who share how they pursued their passion as business people, under the mantra of “do what you love and put yourself out there”.

With the combination of a bachelor of arts in communications from Universidad Católica Andrés Bello in Caracas, Venezuela, and an MBA from the University of Miami, he has extensive experience creating new business opportunities using storytelling. He is also a published author in both English, The Power of Your Story, and Spanish, El Poder de tu Historia and El sí detrás de un no. He was named one of Radio Ink Magazine's Rising Stars as well as Monitor Latino's Radio Personality of the Year in the U.S.

He has spoken for organizations such as Citibank and the Speaking of Women's Health Foundation on "Finding Your Everyday Superhero." Alberto is passionate about giving back to his community, partnering with organizations like Big Brothers Big Sisters, the American Cancer Society, and American Diabetes Association. Together with his wife Fay, he is an active supporter of St. Jude Children's Research Hospital, helping raise millions of dollars over the years.

He lives in Miami, Florida, along with his wife Fay and their daughter Sofia.

== Early life and family ==
Sardiñas belongs to the first generation of Venezuelans in his family, born to a Cuban father, Eloy A. Sardiñas, and a Colombian mother, Gloria Glottmann Sardiñas. He graduated from high school at the Institutos Educacionales Asociados (Associated Educational Institutes) and started his radio career when he was only 17 years old, while beginning his studies in communications at the Universidad Católica Andrés Bello in Caracas.

During that time, he started as a contributor in a radio show on La Mega Estación 107.3 FM and later he was a radio DJ on 92.9 FM between 1996 and 2000. At the same time he was a producer and voiceover announcer for music television station Puma TV, working with Latin artist and entrepreneur José Luis Rodríguez "El Puma" (1996–1998). Between 1997 and 2000, he was also a columnist of the multi-college newspaper Letras.

== Career ==
In 2000, Alberto arrived in the United States to pursue his Master of Business Administration (MBA) with specialization in marketing at the University of Miami, from which he graduated in December 2002.

Meanwhile, also in 2001, he started working as a production assistant and later producer for a morning comedy show in South Florida ("El Vacilón de la Mañana con Enrique Santos y Joe Ferrero", on WXDJ-FM, El Zol 95.7 FM). He later joined sister station WRMA-FM, Romance 106.7 FM, first as a weekend host for the music countdown "La Pizarra de los Exitos" and then as a full-time producer and on-air host of "Viva la Tarde", along with Nancy Elías.

In 2003, he became the executive producer of "El Vacilón de las 7", a television show broadcast on WDLP-TV, Channel 22, hosted by Santos and Ferrero.

At the same time, he was the official voice of "Frecuencia", an entertainment show produced by Emilio Estefan for Telemundo Network. He also worked as the Miami correspondent for cable station Sony Entertainment Television, and during that time he interviewed various artists including Celine Dion, Shakira, Laura Pausini, Marc Anthony, and English band Oasis.

In 2006, he became the host and general producer of Intimo, broadcast by Amor 107.5 FM (WAMR-FM) of Univision Radio in Miami. During the show, Sardiñas listens to personal stories from the audience and offers his personal opinion. Sardiñas shares a message of hope and self-improvement. Each night, listeners take the leading role of the show, sharing their intimate stories and receiving Alberto's opinion as a friend. These stories are combined with music, thoughts and reflections.

In mid 2010, Intimo transformed into a nationally syndicated radio show, currently broadcasting on 31 stations across various cities, including Houston, Texas, Los Angeles, California, Miami, Florida, McAllen, Texas, Fresno, California, San Francisco, California, San Diego, California, Chicago, Illinois and Phoenix, Arizona.

As part of his work as a motivational speaker, he frequently appeared on Univision Network's "Tu Desayuno Alegre" and "Despierta America" as a contributor in the field of self-improvement, about which he also gives conferences around the United States. He has also been a guest on other Univision shows, such as Noticias 23 and Sábado Gigante, and Galavision's Acceso Maximo.

In July 2015, Alberto became a guest reporter for Univision (Channel 23) in Miami with a story titled "Traicion en la Red", (Betrayal on Social Media), a story covering the topic of infidelity via social media.

In 2017, he co-created, produced and became the host of El News Café which airs on Unimás Miami and Univision Miami.

== Motivational speaking ==
In 2006, he created a project to help people achieve their goals, named "Seminarios Puedes Llegar" ("You Can Reach" Seminars). Several celebrities from the Hispanic media and the world of self-help participated during its first run in January 2008, including Dr. Nancy Alvarez and Dr. Isabel Gómez-Bassols.

In 2008, the National Speaking of Women's Health Foundation hired Sardiñas to be their keynote speaker during all of their "Hablando de la Salud de la Mujer" events. There he developed the topic "Finding your everyday superhero", explaining the importance of being surrounded by the right people in order to achieve the life each person dreams of. His inspirational message was received by over 4,000 women in Orlando, Miami, with National Public Television's WPBT Channel 2, San Antonio, Amarillo, El Paso at the Texas Tech University Health Sciences Center Laura W. Bush Institute for Women's Health, and San Diego.

From 2009 to 2010, he wrote a bimonthly motivational column on TVyNovelas magazine, ranked #1 in circulation among Hispanic readers in the US, and titled "Positive Thinking", in which he responds to letters that readers sent to him, sharing their difficult situations. He publishes articles every other week on his blog at albertosardinas.com.

In 2011, he published the book El Poder de Tu Historia by Santillana USA.

In January 2013 he published The Power of Your Story: 40 Short and Real-Life Stories Filled With Lessons, a feel-good book that shares different aspects of human nature, reflecting life's rollercoaster moments.

In 2024, he published his book "El sí detrás de un no (The yes behind a no)." Alberto shows us how to cope with rejection in life and encourages us to try to be the most successful of all time in our careers and personal lives. The book brings together a mix of advice, personal experiences and other stories. The foreword of this book was written by Don Francisco.

== Community involvement ==
When he was 18 years old, his mother was diagnosed with stage III breast cancer. Eight years later, in 2004, Alberto joined Romance 106.7 FM colleague Ariel Ramírez to participate in the Walt Disney World Half Marathon as part of "Team in Training", a program that raises funds for the Leukemia & Lymphoma Society, dedicated to finding a cure for blood related cancers. In order to accomplish this goal, he abandoned a sedentary lifestyle and started training four to five times a week, several miles per day. "If we did it, almost everyone can. Trust me: We never thought we could be marathon runners," Alberto told the local press at that time.

During his mother's illness, and also after her death in 2006, Alberto has been involved in causes such as St. Jude Children's Research Hospital, through the annual radio marathon "Promesa y Esperanza" ("Promise and Hope") with Univision Radio which in 2011 raised $4.7 million U.S. dollars for the cause, and in events such as the Annual FedEx/St. Jude Angels & Stars Gala in Miami, Florida.

Also, as a part of his community involvement, in 2008 Starbucks celebrated the "12 days of joy", surprising South Florida residents with great events and random acts of kindness, and Alberto was involved as one of the local personalities, preparing coffee and sharing some personal time with the audience.

He was also a member of the Hispanic Advisory Council and the Marketing Committee for Big Brothers Big Sisters of Greater Miami.

In August 2012, he became a member of the board of directors for Radio Lollipop USA "Radio Lollipop believes in the healing power of play-providing smiles and laughter to children at a time when they need it most."

== Achievements ==
Alberto was chosen by Radio Ink magazine as one of its 2012 Rising Stars. He was also named Radio Personality of the Year in the Pop Format in the United States at the prestigious Monitor Latino Convention 2014, in Los Angeles, California.

Alberto was chosen by the National Speaking of Women's Health Foundation, to be their Keynote Speaker during all of their "Hablando de la Salud de la Mujer" events. His inspirational message was received by over 4,000 women in Orlando, Miami, San Antonio, Amarillo, El Paso and San Diego.

He is actively involved with non-profit organizations including St. Jude Children's Research Hospital and Big Brothers Big Sisters. He is also a Member of the Board of Radio Lollipop USA. He has a BA in Communications from Universidad Católica Andrés Bello in Caracas, Venezuela and an MBA from the University of Miami.

== Bibliography ==
- Sardiñas, Alberto (2011). El Poder de Tu Historia
- Sardiñas, Alberto (2013). The Power of Your Story
- Sardiñas, Alberto (2024). El sí detrás de un no (The yes behind a no)
