= Gabriel Velasco (politician) =

Colombian lawyer, businessman and politician

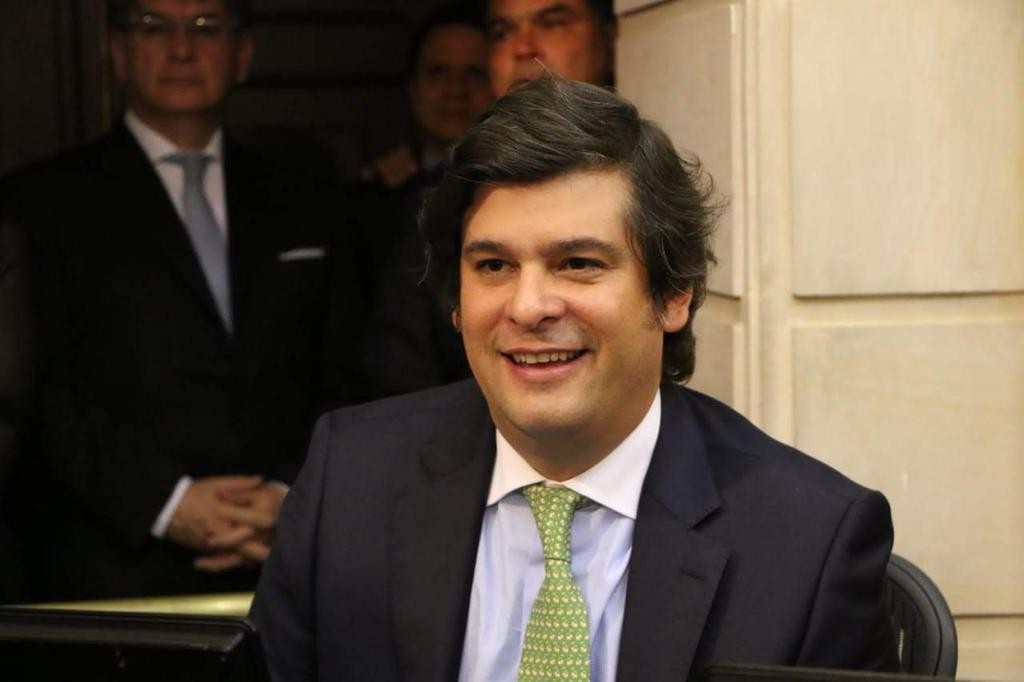

Senator of the Republic of Colombia
- In office July 20, 2018 – July 20, 2022

Personal details
- Born: Gabriel Jaime Velasco Ocampo; April 9, 1973 (age 53) Tuluá, Colombia
- Party: Democratic Center
- Education: University of the Andes; ICESI University; Northwestern University
- Occupation: Politician, lawyer, businessman

Gabriel Jaime Velasco Ocampo (April 9, 1973, Tuluá, Colombia) is a Colombian lawyer, businessman and politician, former senator of the Republic of Colombia.

== Biography ==
He studied law at the Universidad de los Andes. He has a specialization in Business administration from Universidad ICESI, a diploma in Integral Logistics from SINTEC Mexico and "Reinventing Leadership" from the Kellogg Management School at North Western University in Chicago.

He developed a long business career, mainly in the dairy industry, becoming commercial manager of Lácteos Andina, general manager of Prolav and vice president of Nutrition of Alquería (2004–2012), as well as vice president of Metrocali between 2013 and 2014.

He was president of the National Association of Industrialists of Colombia, Valle del Cauca section.

== Political career ==
In the 2018 legislative elections, he was elected on the senatorial list of the Democratic Center Party with 33,180 votes. Although it had been widely speculated that he would be a candidate for the Chamber of Representatives for the Conservative Party, in the end this was not the case. In the Senate, he is a member of the Seventh Commission.

== Controversies ==
He was involved in a controversy when he suggested to the Archbishop of Cali, Monsignor Dario de Jesus Monsalve, to leave his position in the Church, after he declared that the government of Ivan Duque "blames everything on drug trafficking to justify the massacres of the State'.
