= Jhon Arcila =

Colombian footballer (born 2006)

Personal information
- Full name: Jhon Esteban Arcila Vargas
- Date of birth: 24 March 2006 (age 20)
- Place of birth: Tuluá, Valle del Cauca, Colombia
- Height: 1.81 m (5 ft 11 in)
- Positions: Attacking midfielder; winger

Team information
- Current team: Córdoba CF B

Youth career
- Cortuluá

Senior career*
Years	Team	Apps	(Gls)
2023	Cortuluá	6	(0)
2024	Inter Palmira	5	(0)
2024–2026	Real Betis C	6	(0)
2026–	Córdoba B	8	(0)

International career
2024	Colombia U20		
- * Club domestic league appearances and goals as of 23:04, 17 July 2026 (UTC)

Jhon Esteban Arcila Vargas (born 24 March 2006) is a Colombian footballer currently playing as a winger for Spanish club Córdoba B.

== Club career ==
Born in Tuluá in the Valle del Cauca Department of Colombia, Arcila began his career with Cortuluá, progressing through the academy before making his Categoría Primera B debut in 2023. In late 2023, it was reported that he had agreed a deal with Spanish side Real Betis to go ahead at the beginning of the 2024–25 season. In June 2024 he completed the move, signing a five-year deal with Betis having spent the first half of 2024 with Inter Palmira - the club founded as a rebranding following Cortuluá's folding. He joined the club via their Betis Talent programme, a project seeking to find players from lesser known leagues or teams to bring into Betis' academy, alongside fellow Colombian Keimer Sandoval.

A week after signing he scored a goal in the Supercopa Monterrey, an under-19 competition for clubs from around the world, in Betis' 3–1 win against C.F. Monterrey. In September 2024 his goal against Sporting Atlético Ceuta - the third in a 3–0 win - went viral for its similarities to Diego Maradona's goal of the century; dribbling past a number of players, Arcila wrong-footed the goalkeeper with a shot that found the bottom corner of the goal.

In January 2026, Arcila joined Córdoba B.

== International career ==
Arcila was called up to the Colombia under-20 side for friendly matches in October 2024.

== Career statistics ==
=== Club ===
As of 17 July 2026.

Appearances and goals by club, season and competition
Club	Season	League			Cup (Note: Includes Copa Colombia and Copa del Rey)		Other		Total	
Club	Season	Division	Apps	Goals	Apps	Goals	Apps	Goals	Apps	Goals
Cortuluá	2023	Categoría Primera B	6	0	2	0	0	0	8	0
Inter Palmira	2024	Categoría Primera B	5	0	0	0	0	0	5	0
Real Betis C	2024–25	División de Honor Andalusia	0	0	0	0	0	0	0	0
Real Betis C	2025–26	División de Honor Andalusia	6	0	0	0	0	0	6	0
Real Betis C	Total		6	0	0	0	0	0	6	0
Córdoba B	2025–26	Tercera Federación	8	0	0	0	0	0	8	0
Career total			25	0	2	0	0	0	27	0
