= Rafael Mercadante =

Mexican actor

- Born: Rafael Mercadante Mena; Mexico City
- Occupations: Actor, television host, singer
- Years active: 1993–present
- Spouse: María Mercedes Aragón (2006–2021)

Rafael Mercadante Mena is a Mexican actor, television host, singer and radio DJ who has worked in both Mexico and the United States. In the 1990s he was cast in soap operas such as El Manantial and El Privilegio de Amar, as well performing in films and plays. He later went on to host several television programs, and in 2007, won an Emmy Award after hosting "El Desfile de las Rosas" (The Rose Parade) for Univision, in Los Angeles, California.

From 200 to 2002, he presented a Mexican radio program, La Pijama, and has also produced three albums, with songs in the Norteño and Duranguense genres. In 2003, he joined the U.S. Spanish-language television network as a host and producer where he was nominated for a "Revelacion Juvenil" (Young Revelation) Award in the TVyNovelas Awards.

== Early life ==
He first appeared on television aged ten on a local channel in Monterrey with a dancing team, "Rafael y su Ballet", and later was involved in another group, "Karma" which performed in Saltillo, Coahuila. In 1993 Mercadante received a scholarship from Mexican media company Televisa to study at the Centro de Educacion Artistica (Center for Artistic Education) in Mexico City from which he graduated in 1995.

== Work ==
=== Theater ===
Year	Title
1991	Vaselina
1991	Jesucristo Superestrella
1992	Monte Calvo
1993	La Mudanza
1994	El Inspector
1995	El Libro de la Selva
1996	Piratas
1996	Power Rangers
1997	Dumbo
1998	Besame Salvaje
1998	Navaja Caliente
1999	Cenicienta
1999	El Enfermo Imaginario
2003	Todos tenemos Problemas Sexuales
2003	La Bella y la Bestia

=== Television ===
- Pioneer Host satellite TV ( SKY )
- Canal Banda Max, programas: "La Ley del Top" "Y Sigue la Furia Dando" 97,98 ( SKY )
- TV Host Ritmoson 98,99,00 ( Cablevision )
- Programas "Top 5 Grupero", "Grito Norteno", "Reventados".(SKY)
- TV Host "Premios Furia Musical" 98,99,00,01 (Televisa )
- TV Host "Acapulco Fest" 99,00,01,02,04 ( Televisa )
- TV Host "Fiesta Mexicana" 99,00,01,02,04 ( Televisa )
- TV Host "Especial Los Tigres del Norte en el Zocalo"( Televisa )
- TV Host "Temerarios en el Estadio Azteca" ( Televisa )
- TV Host "Que Todo Mexico se Entere" TV Show "HOY"
- TV Host Programa "Todo Se Vale" (Televisa)
- TV Host Programa "Reventon Musical" (Televisa)
- TV Host Grito Mexicano 04,05, 06,07(Univision)
- TV Host Red Carpet (Premios Juventud, Univision) 04,05,06,07,08
- TV Host Programa "Accesso Total" (Premios Juventud) (Univision )04,05,06,07,08
- TV Host "Festival del Mariachi" 04,05 (Univision)
- TV Host Invitado Programa "Escandalo Tv "(Telefutura)04,05,06,07
- TV Host "Premios Furia Musical" 04,05,06,07(Univision)
- TV Host "Premios TV y Novelas" 05,07 (Univision)
- TV Host "Noche de estrellas de Tv y novelas" (Univision)05,07
- TV Host Co-TV Host "Fin de Año" 04,05,06 (Univision)
- TV Host Invitado programa "Despierta America" 05,06,07 (Univision)
- TV Host " Rumbo a Premio Lo nuestro" 06 (Galavision)
- TV Host and Associate Producer Programa "Caliente" (Univision) 03,04,05,06
- TV Host " Las Mananitas de Guadalupe " 06,07,08( Univision )
- TV Host " Desfile de las Rosas 06 ,08" GANADOR DEL EMMY(Univision)
- TV Host " El Juego Supremo " 08 (Univision )
- Anchor and Entertainment Reporter " Primer Impacto fin de semana " 06,07,08,09(Univision)

=== Soap Operas ===
- Agujetas de Color de Rosa (1994)
- Gente Bien
- Retrato de Familia
- El Privilegio de Amar
- El Manantial

=== Radio ===
- "La Pillama" (host) Cadena Firmesa Raza y Radio Cadena Nacional (2000–2002)

=== Other works ===
- ¿Quién Tiene la Razón?, as a panelist
- "En Familia con Chabelo"
- "La Cuchufleta"
- "Mujer Casos de la Vida Real"

== Records ==
- Mi Joven Corazon (2001 )
- Rafael Mercadante Acompanado de Patrulla 81 y Control (2006)
- Estas ganas que tengo (2008)
