= Andrés Archila =

Guatemalan musician

Backstage at Constitution Hall rehearsal, 1959.

Andrés Archila (December 24, 1913 – March 2, 2002) was a Guatemalan international violinist and orchestra conductor. He was the principal founder and conductor of the Guatemalan National Symphony Orchestra from 1944 to 1964, founder of the Quarteto Guatemala, Associate Concertmaster of Washington, D.C.'s National Symphony Orchestra from 1959 to 1984, and soloist and conductor with major orchestras of the Americas during his lifetime. Maestro Archila was born in Guatemala City, Guatemala, on December 24, 1913, and he died in Washington, D.C., on March 2, 2002, and is interred in his country, Guatemala.

== Early life ==
Archila was born into a musical family. His father, principally a restaurateur, played the upright bass and marimba. His brother, Juan, played the cello for the National Symphony Orchestra of Mexico, and his youngest brother, Simeon, switched between principal viola and principal second violin for the Guatemalan National Symphony Orchestra. His Sephardic mother, Rosario, and sister, Jesus, were restaurateurs.

Maestro Archila began musical studies in piano and violin at the age of four. At seven, he gave his first violin concert with the Guatemalan military band/orchestra (the only musical ensemble during the dictatorships of that time). During his childhood and adolescence, Andrés studied violin with the most prominent musicians in Guatemala, many of whom were Italian or German expatriates from the late 1800s, and assumed principal positions in the military band/orchestra and conservatory. Since the age of ten he performed and earned a sustainable living playing at church functions, weddings, assembling chamber players for private functions, and even assembling orchestra players for "pit" background music to silent movies at the "Teatro Lux". He would eventually become a regular first violin with the military orchestra. One time he was nearly wounded while playing at an outdoor concert during a failed coup d'état. The bullet lodged into the seat of his chair.

In an effort to expand Andrés’ musicianship, the father moved the family to Rome, Italy, in 1931. The father, Andres and Juan entertained the ship's crew and passengers while crossing the Atlantic. In Rome, Maestro Archila studied at the National Academy of Santa Cecilia. His studies focused on piano, violin, music theory, composition and orchestration. With the rise of fascism and increasing rumblings of war in Europe, the family crossed the Atlantic back to Guatemala in 1937.

== Guatemala After Italy ==
Upon their return to Guatemala they encountered yet another dictatorship, all but devoid of an appreciation for the arts. Andres continued playing with the military band/orchestra and continued with private work as soloist, assembling quartets for weddings, social and religious functions, and started conducting orchestral groups in Central and South America. Musical and artistic oppression and dictatorship continued in Guatemala, to the point that Maestro Archila would be jailed on nights prior to performances that were demanded for the dictator's events.

== Revolucion del '44 ==
With the overthrow of the Ubico dictatorship in 1944, and the ensuing economic and social reforms of the first democratically elected president of Guatemala, Dr. Juan Jose Arevalo, Andrés Archila was made the director of the Guatemalan National Symphony Orchestra. During his tenure, which would last until 1964, he assembled the best classical players from Guatemala and Central America.

He was both a conductor and frequent soloist. As soloist, his virtuosity was displayed before sold-out concerts performing the classic violin concertos of Tchaikovsky, Beethoven, Brahms, Bruch, Mendelssohn, Mozart and Lalo. Maestro Franz Ippich, who fled to Guatemala escaping the Nazis in Vienna, wrote a violin concerto for him encapsulating Wagnerian and Guatemalan Son riffs that Andres interpreted with utmost grace, passion and humor. Maestro Jorje Sarmientos, who would take over the role of conductor after Andres’ departure, also wrote a modern dodecaphonic violin concerto for him. In addition, Andres would strive to introduce new modern pieces to the standard repertoire like, Stravinsky, Prokofiev, Barber, Berg and Dvorak violin concertos. Maestro Archila played on a French Villaume violin built in 1827.

As conductor he forged fire, soul, delicateness, and passion, when performing the music of Beethoven, Tchaikovsky, Mozart and Brahms. He was noted for performing concerts outside of the traditional Conservatory venue, and into the ruins and remote villages of Guatemala. A most memorable concert was performing Beethoven's 9th with a full choral, at the cathedral ruins of Antigua in 1952. During his tenure as director of the Guatemalan National Symphony Orchestra, and especially before the overthrow of President Jacobo Arbenz, Maestro Archila attracted the best musicians in Guatemala and from the Americas, and was able to create an orchestra whose music transcended political, economic, social and cultural boundaries. The orchestra and Andres Archila shared guest-conducting and solo roles when traveling to Mexico, (performing with José Pablo Moncayo), Chile (performing with Victor Tevah), and Colombia (performing with Guillermo Espinoza). The Guatemalan National Symphony Orchestra also visited all of Central America.

During this time, Maestro Archila became very good friends with Humberto "Meme" Solis a Guatemalan wood sculptor and luthier. Meme and Andres experimented in making violins and succeeded in making excellent quality instruments. Meme also made instruments for other Guatemalan and Central American musicians. Many of these instruments survive and are being played in orchestras.

At the height of this Guatemalan artistic renaissance was the birth of a new generation of virtuosi, such as pianist Manuel Herrarte, bassoonist Nacho Vidal, timpanist and composer Jorge Sarmientos, to name a few.

In 1961 he received Guatemala's highest honor, the "Orden del Quetzal", for his artistic achievements. He received honorary degrees from the Universidad de San Carlos and Universidad Francisco Marroquin.

== Quarteto Guatemala ==
Additionally, during 1948–1964 Andres Archila founded the Quarteto Guatemala whose members included himself as first violin, Carlos Ciudadreal, second violin, Eduardo Ortiz Lara, cello, and, Humberto Ayestas, viola. The quartet performed in Washington, D.C., New York, Los Angeles, Dallas, Mexico, Chile, Colombia and all of Central America.

== The National Symphony Orchestra ==
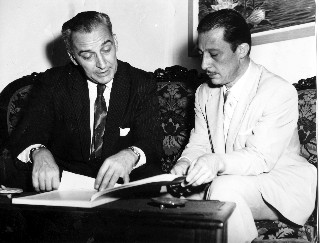
Maestros Howard Mitchell and Andres Archila reviewing bowing, 1960.

In 1958, Maestro Archila hosted a memorable visit by Washington, D.C.'s National Symphony Orchestra, conducted by Maestro Howard Mitchell, as part of their South America tour. The musicians exchanged friendship, culture and music. By then the Guatemalan National Symphony Orchestra had lost many of its best members to other orchestras in the Americas and Europe. Dictators and military leaders prevailed over the Guatemala's short lived democracy and the climate for the arts was dismal, at best. In the summer of 1959, Maestro Archila auditioned for the National Symphony Orchestra and began work in the US as Associate Concertmaster that September.

He moved his wife, Mercedes, and their children to Washington, D.C., in October of the same year, after finding housing and buying a 1960 Chevrolet Biscayne. On his first day in the United States he found $5.00 on the street! Maestro Archila spoke Spanish and Italian. In the musical arena he had no linguistic challenges as the language of music is in Italian and musical notations, and gestures. In daily American life Maestro Archila communicated through music, gestures and a mixture of Spanish, Italian and nascent English. He eventually learned English, on his own, by intermingling with his National Symphony Orchestra friends (most notably Maestros Edward Gummel, Kenneth Pasmanick, John Martin, and Maestrina Virginia Harpham), his siblings, and by watching westerns and wrestling on TV.

Andres Archila was Associate Concertmaster for the National Symphony Orchestra under the batons of Maestros Howard Mitchell, Antal Doráti and Mstislav Rostropovich. After his retirement in 1984, he continued to conduct and perform solo with the Guatemalan National Symphony Orchestra. His performances of Chausson's Poème for violin and orchestra and Jean Sibelius Concerto for Violin at the age of 85 were his last performances with Igor Sarmientos conducting the National Symphony Orchestra of Guatemala in September 1997.

1993 Concert at La Merced, playing Mozart's #5. Brother, Simeon, is playing Second Violin, Conducting: Ricardo del Carmen.

== Andres Archila Quotes ==
"Hay mas tiempo que vida!"
"Para eso no se estudia!"
"Such is the life in the Tropics, Baby."
"Anoche te soñe ... cara de tetunte!"
