= Nancy Alvarez (psychologist) =

Dominican psychologist and television personality

Nancy Álvarez
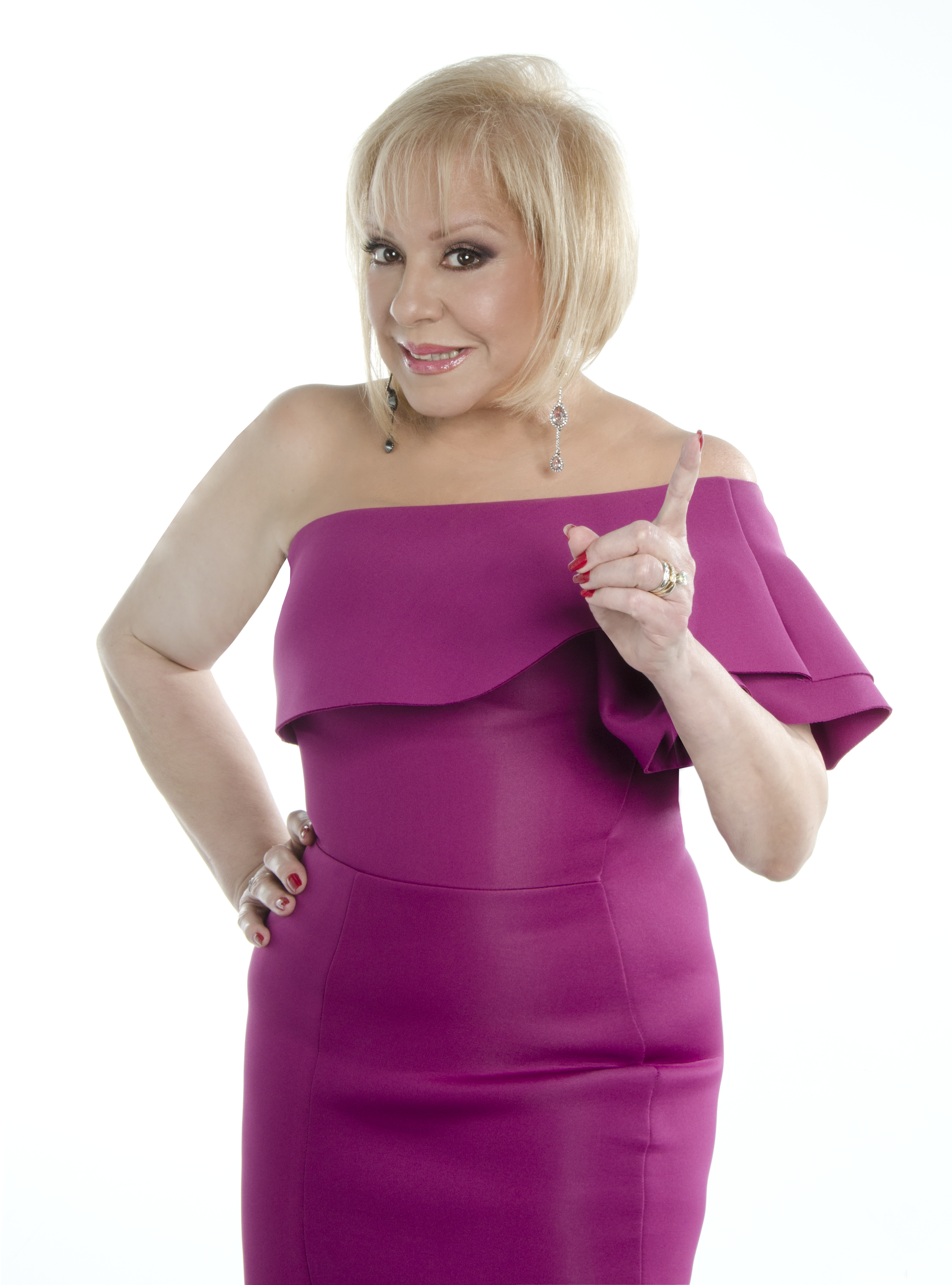
- Born: 10 October 1951 (age 73); Santo Domingo, Dominican Republic
- Occupation(s): Talk show host Psychologist
- Website: www.nancyalvarez.com

Nancy Álvarez (born 10 October 1951) is a Dominican singer, television personality, and licensed clinical psychologist, sexologist, and family therapist. She is best known for hosting the talk show ¿Quién Tiene La Razón?, where she helped counsel families and couples with their interpersonal problems.

She is currently co hosting a show called “Desiguales” for Univision; the largest Hispanic in the United States, and Dra. Nancy, a digital show produced on her own together with her closest friend and producer Catriel Leiras.

== Biography ==
Her singing career began in the 1970s when she moved to Puerto Rico. Álvarez began her professional career as a performer at the age of 15 and soon became the lead singer with Michel Camilo's band, an international group which toured in the 1970s.

She graduated from the Autonomous University of Santo Domingo. By the 1980s, following her studies, she began a new career a television producer and host, specializing in personal and family relationships and sex therapy. Among the number of programs she produced was Solo para Adultos (Adults Only) (1985–89) and the section Prohibido (Forbidden) which, for four years, was a part of the show 100 Grados (100 Degrees). Her other productions included the educational program Bloque de Fuego (Fire Block) for which she received several awards, Nancy en Especial and El Alma Desnuda de los Famosos (The Naked Soul of Celebrities). Her most recent program, ¿Quién Tiene La Razón? was broadcast by Univision and produced by Venevisión International.

Álvarez is also a writer, frequently contributing to several newspapers in Santo Domingo and Colombia. She started writing for El Nacional in 1995, subsequently contributing articles to Listín Diario and Ultima Hora. In 1997, she began writing a column for Hoy and El Nacional. She has also served as vice-president of the Center of Clinical and Industrial Psychology, is president of Psychology and Sexuality Counselors, Inc., and has devoted time to private counseling.

In 2005, she decided to return to the musical stage, without leaving her career as a sexologist, and thus created a unique performance, educating her audience in matters of sex and, at the same time, performing related songs. Her partner in the show is the Puerto Rican singer and composer Lou Briel, performing as singer and musical director. The most recent title for the show was Sólo para Hombres... y también para Mujeres.

In 2008, she participated as one of the guest speakers in the motivational conference, Puedes Llegar, a project created by Alberto Sardinas. In 2009, she underwent multiple plastic surgery procedures.
