= Paula Arcila =

Colombian radio host, TV personality, and playwright

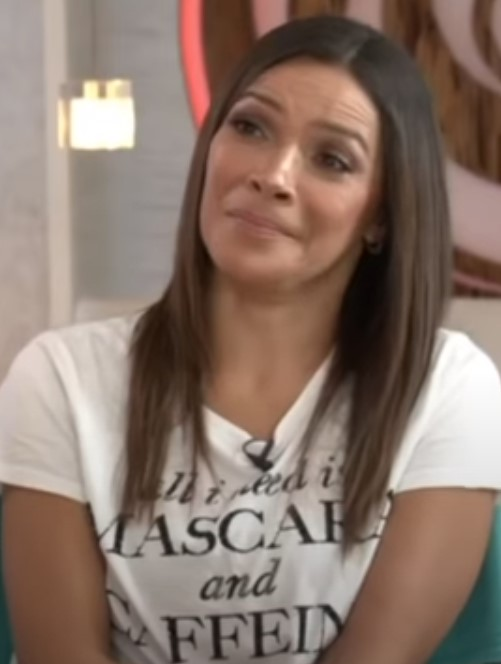
- Born: February 27, 1975 (age 50); Medellín, Colombia
- Notable work: Miss Cuarenta; Un Cambio Demente
- Website: www.paulaarcila.com

Paula Arcila (born February 27, 1975, in Medellín, Colombia) is a Colombian radio host, television personality, comedic playwright and actress, and author. She is best known for being a radio host for El Desayuno Musical on Univision Radio in South Florida and for being a recurring panelist on the television show ¿Quién tiene la razón? for several years. She has toured her one-woman comedy show Miss Cuarenta in the United States, Spain, and Ecuador.

== Biography ==
Paula Arcila grew up in the Belén neighborhood of Medellín, Colombia. She has two younger siblings, Juan Esteban and María Angélica. Several of her uncles were involved in Colombian radio and growing up, she used to join them at work during her time off from school. The first radio program she joined was Los habitantes de la noche. She also had her own radio show in Colombia. In 1996, she moved to Miami, Florida.

She started her career in the United States on the Caracol Radio program "De Regreso a Casa".

In 2007, Arcila joined the television show ¿Quién tiene la razón? as one of the "archis" who gave their advice and opinion. She remained on the show until 2012.

She made her theatrical debut in The Vagina Monologues. She has additionally been in the plays Taxi and Mujer Ligera.

In 2015, she debuted her monologue Miss Cuarenta written, produced, and acted by her with the direction of Leandro Fernandez. The monologue discusses what it is like to turn 40 years old. She has toured the monologue in Miami, Washington, D.C., at the GALA Hispanic Theatre, Ecuador, and Spain.

In 2017, she published her autobiography Una Reina Sin Medidas. She also has a podcast with the same name. Arcila left her radio job in December 2017 to move to Madrid, Spain. She briefly returned to Miami in 2018 to tour her new monologue Un Cambio Demente at Trail Theater.

== Personal life ==
She dated personal trainer and radio host José Fernández. In 2015, she sued him and Penguin Group for not paying her as a writer nor acknowledging her as an author for their book Salvando Vidas, which she claimed they co-wrote.

She has spoken out several times about being a survivor of abuse.

== Bibliography ==
=== Books ===
- Una Reina Sin Medidas, 2017

=== Monologues ===
- Un Cambio Demente, 2018
- Miss Cuarenta, 2015
