= Luis Jiménez (radio host) =

Puerto Rican-American radio host

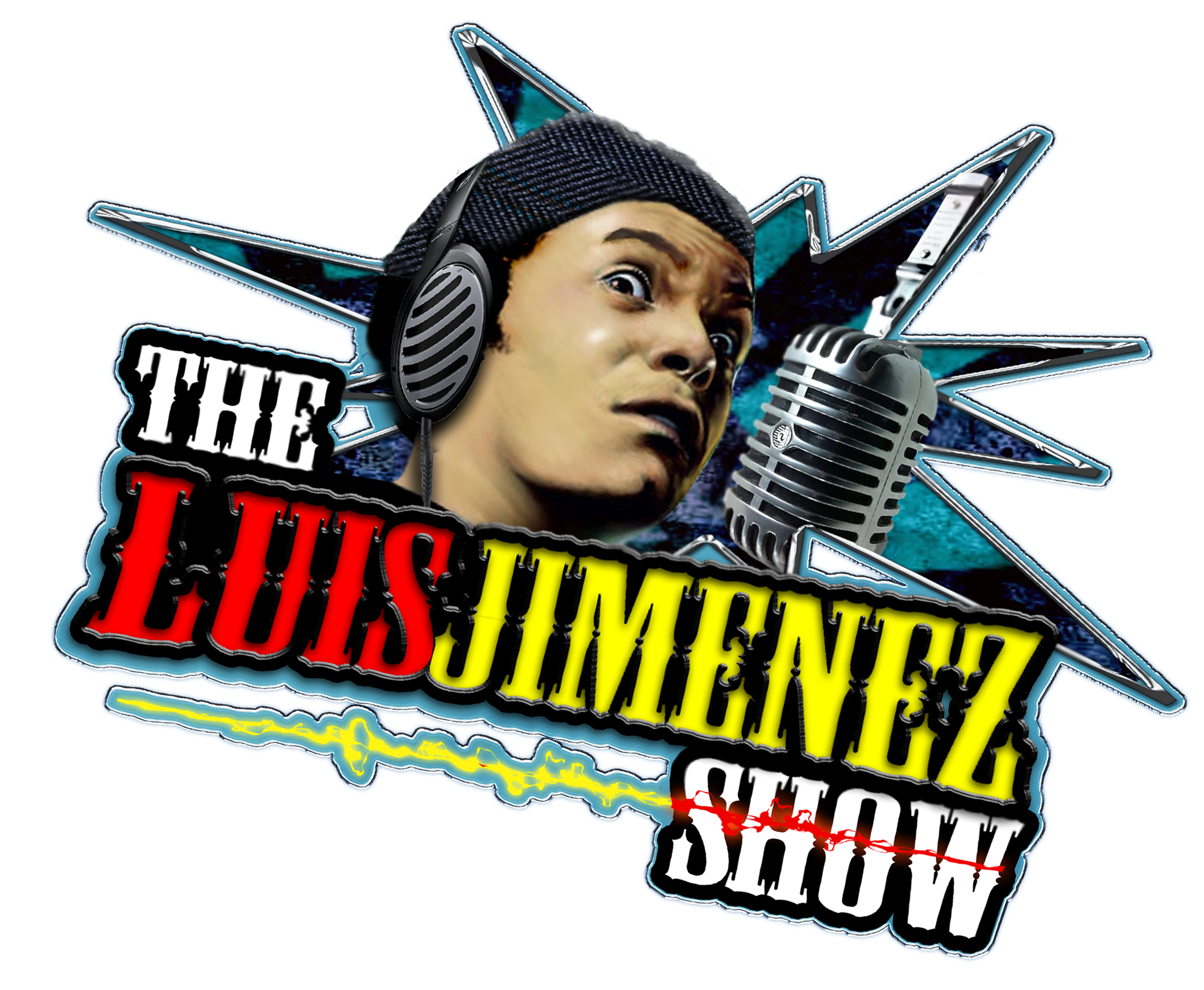
Luis Jimenez Show Logo

Luis Jimenez is a Puerto Rican-American comedian and Spanish radio host. Jimenez created "El Vacilón de la Mañana", the morning show which, during its 13 years on the air, grew to become the No.1 morning show, in the New York market, and the most listened to Spanish radio morning show in the U.S. It was syndicated in X markets and heard worldwide on the show's website, ElVacilon.com.

== Biography ==
As a child growing up in Puerto Rico, Jimenez was fascinated with radio. When Jimenez was six, his father offered to take him to Disney World. Jimenez turned down the offer and asked if he could go visit a radio station instead. Jimenez took his first steps in broadcasting working as a part-timer in Puerto Rican radio. In 1989 he moved to Orlando, Florida to work in a local radio station where his friend had become a program director. Things didn't quite go his way, and the young radio hopeful had to take work as a maintenance employee while keeping his position on the air. In 1993, his friend George Mier, who had become Program Director of WSKQ, invited him to move to New York to host the morning show. On August 9, 1993, El Vacilón de la Mañana was born.

Jimenez, alongside his morning crew, interacted with callers and celebrities from Jennifer Lopez to Donald Trump.

Luis Jimenez's talents reach beyond radio. Jimenez has sold-out shows at Carolines, The Comedy Garden at New York's Madison Square Garden and at the New York Comedy Festival. His first album, "El Vacilon de la Mañana's Tortilla Party," was nominated for a prestigious Billboard Latin Music Award, marking the first time a radio personality had received the honour. Since then, he's released three additional comedy albums. In 2005, Jimenez released the feature film, "El Vacilón: The Movie." The movie had an eight-week run in limited release and was then released on DVD.

For more than seven years, the entertainer performed on the small screen with two programs, "Sábado 47" and "WEPA", a program that he also created and produced. In addition, Jimenez is the voice of HBO Latino and History Channel en Español.

Jimenez has received many honours, including being named the Padrino (Godfather) of the National Puerto Rican Day Parade of 2003. The official announcement was made during his radio program by former First Lady of the United States and U.S. Senator Hillary Clinton. Jimenez has been invited to participate in different debates on the Latino vote on CNN's Election Center hosted by John Roberts.

In January 2008 after 13 Years with SBS’ La Mega 97.9 in New York, which aired his show "El Vacilón de la Mañana", Jimenez launched "The Luis Jimenez show" on the Univision radio network, WCAA 105.9fm. This show was syndicated across the U.S. adding several markets and broadcast live from Univision's studio in Midtown Manhattan.

In 2015, Jimenez launched his online radio venture, the Luis Network over Labor Day weekend. This online venture puts Jiminez and his wife Alma, who is his show's executive producer and on-air talent, in the driver's seat. Owning the network will allow Luis to speak his mind without restrictions, controlling the content and the revenues.

== Works ==
- Nueba Yol 3: Bajo la nueva ley (1997)
- The Siege (1998)
- In Plain Sight (2004)
- El vacilón: The Movie (2005)
- Feliz Navidad (2006)
- Falling Awake (2009)

== See also ==
- List of Puerto Rican comedians
