= Chef Pepín =

José Hernández, better known as Chef Pepín is a Spanish-language media personality and self-taught chef.

== Overview ==
He was born in Matanzas, Cuba, in 1948, where he grew up on a farm and learned to make cheese, sausages and dry beef from his mother and grandmother. He moved to the US at age 12 and growing up he began a series of food-related jobs working as a cook at a marina and at a convenience store. In 1988 he joined Univision and is currently featured on an ongoing cooking segment on Despierta América. He also has a cooking show on the MGM Networks Latin America, and makes regular appearances on Miami's WPBT-2's magazine show, New Florida.

Pepín is also a brand spokesperson for packaged-goods companies such as Sun-Maid Baking Raisins, Green Giant, Stouffer's, Coca-Cola, Borden, Uncle Ben's Rice, Tyson Foods and Knorr Soups & Seasonings and makes numerous personal appearances, specifically representing Knorr for in-store demonstrations and endorsements.

Maria Garza of the Mexican American Council, for whom Pepín has emceed events, has called him “a national treasure”, stating “he’s not just the TV personality, the Chef. He’s also an outstanding human being”. Chef Pepin also donates his time to charity events. Additionally he also works to teach Latin & Hispanic Americans to prepare healthier versions of classic dishes without sacrificing flavor.

Chef Pepín is married to his high school sweetheart Telvy, he has two children Anamaria and Jose Antonio and resides in Miami. He is the author of the Spanish-language, Latin cookbook Cooking With Chef Pepín (ISBN 978-0941010153). He also has a successful line of kitchenware and small cooking appliances.
