= The Cult of iPod =

Book by Leander Kahney

- Language: English
- Genre: Non-fiction
- Publisher: No Starch Press
- Publication date: November 2005
- Publication place: United States
- ISBN: 9781593270667
- OCLC: 633551267
- Preceded by: The Cult of Mac

The Cult of iPod is a book by Leander Kahney. It is the sequel to The Cult of Mac. The cover of the book features an iPod click wheel shaved into a person's head.
