= The Manga Guides =

Educational book series

- Cover of the English edition of The Manga Guide to Statistics, published by No Starch Press in 2008

マンガでわかる (Manga de Wakaru)
- Genre: Non-fiction, Comedy
- Manga
- Published by: Ohmsha
- English publisher: US: No Starch Press
- Original run: 2003 – present
- Volumes: 50

The Manga Guides (Japanese: マンガでわかる, Hepburn: Manga de Wakaru) is a series of educational Japanese manga books. Each volume explains a particular subject in science or mathematics. The series is published in Japan by Ohmsha, in the United States by No Starch Press, in France by H&K, in Italy by L'Espresso, in Malaysia by Pelangi, in Taiwan by Shimo Publishing, and in Poland by PWN. Different volumes are written by different authors.

== Volume list ==
The series to date as of February 18, 2023, consists of 50 volumes in Japan. Fourteen of them have been published in English and six in French so far, with more planned, including one on sociology. In contrast, 49 of them have been published and translated in Chinese. One of the books has been translated into Swedish.

| Japanese editions | English editions |
|---|---|
| 「マンガでわかる - 統計学」- Manga de wakaru - Tōkeigaku – "Learn with manga - Statistics" (ISBN 978-4-274-06570-5) | The Manga Guide to Statistics (ISBN 978-1-59327-189-3) |
| 「マンガでわかる - 統計学 回帰分析編」 - Manga de wakaru - Tōkeigaku kaiki bunsekihen – "Learn with manga - Statistics Regression Analysis" (ISBN 978-4-274-06614-6) | The Manga Guide to Regression Analysis (ISBN 978-1-59327-419-1) |
| 「マンガでわかる - データベース」- Manga de wakaru - Dētabēsu – "Learn with manga - Databases" (ISBN 978-4-274-06631-3) | The Manga Guide to Databases (ISBN 978-1-59327-190-9) |
| 「マンガでわかる - 微分積分」- Manga de wakaru - Bibun sekibun – "Learn with manga - Calculus" (ISBN 978-4-274-06632-0) | The Manga Guide to Calculus (ISBN 978-1-59327-194-7) |
| 「マンガでわかる - フーリエ解析」 - Manga de wakaru - Fūrie kaiseki – "Learn with manga - Fourier analysis" (ISBN 978-4-274-06617-7) | N/A |
| 「マンガでわかる - 統計学 因子分析編」 - Manga de wakaru - Tōkeigaku inshi bunsekihen – "Learn with manga - Statistics: Factor analysis" | N/A |
| 「マンガでわかる - 物理 力学編」- Manga de wakaru - Butsuri rikigakuhen – "Learn with manga - Physics" (ISBN 978-4-274-06665-8) | The Manga Guide to Physics (ISBN 978-1-59327-196-1) |
| 「マンガでわかる - 電気」- Manga de wakaru - Denki – "Learn with manga - Electricity" (ISBN 978-4-274-06672-6) | The Manga Guide to Electricity (ISBN 978-1-59327-197-8) |
| 「マンガでわかる - 暗号」- Manga de wakaru - Angō – "Learn with manga - Cryptography" (ISBN 978-4-274-06674-0) | The Manga Guide to Cryptography (ISBN 978-1-59327-742-0) |
| 「マンガでわかる - 分子生物学」- Manga de wakaru - Bunshiseibutsugaku – "Learn with manga - Molecular Biology" (ISBN 978-4-274-06702-0) | The Manga Guide to Molecular Biology (ISBN 978-1-59327-202-9) |
| 「マンガでわかる - 測量」 - Manga de wakaru - Sokuryō – "Learn with manga - Measurement" (ISBN 978-4-274-06725-9) | N/A |
| 「マンガでわかる - シーケンス制御」 - Manga de wakaru - Shīkensu seigyo – "Learn with manga - control flow (ISBN 978-4-274-06735-8) | N/A |
| 「マンガでわかる - 線形代数」- Manga de wakaru - Senkei daisū – "Learn with manga - Linear Algebra" (ISBN 978-4-274-06741-9) | The Manga Guide to Linear Algebra (ISBN 978-1-59327-413-9) |
| 「マンガでわかる - 宇宙」- Manga de wakaru - Uchū – "Learn with manga - Universe" (ISBN 978-4-274-06737-2) | The Manga Guide to the Universe (ISBN 978-1-59327-267-8) |
| 「マンガでわかる - 生化学」- Manga de wakaru - Seikagaku – "Learn with manga - Biochemistry" (ISBN 978-4-274-06740-2) | The Manga Guide to Biochemistry (ISBN 978-1-59327-276-0) |
| 「マンガでわかる - 相対性理論」- Manga de wakaru - Sōtaiseiriron – "Learn with manga - The Theory of Relativity" (ISBN 978-4-274-06759-4) | The Manga Guide to Relativity (ISBN 978-1-59327-272-2) |
| 「マンガでわかる - 基礎生理学」 - Manga de wakaru - Kiso seirigaku – "Learn with manga - Basic Physiology" (ISBN 978-4-274-06871-3) | The Manga Guide to Physiology (ISBN 978-1-59327-440-5) |
| 「マンガでわかる - CPU」 - Manga de wakaru - CPU – "Learn with manga - CPU" (ISBN 978-4-274-05061-9) | The Manga Guide to Microprocessors (ISBN 978-1-59327-817-5) |
| 「マンガでわかる - 微分方程式」- Manga de wakaru - Bibun hōteshiki – "Learn with Manga - Differential Equations" (ISBN 978-4-274-06786-0) | N/A |

== The Manga Guide to Statistics ==
The first book in the series, this 236-page guide explains statistics and the glossary tied to it, like mean values, averages and sampling from a statistical population. The book is composed of seven chapters, with a prologue, an appendix and an index.

High school student Rui gets a visit from Mr. Igarashi, a statistician working for her father. Instantly falling in love with him, she decides to study statistics so that she can get close enough to him. However, her teacher is not Mr. Igarashi, but a certain Mr. Yamamoto, whom she initially despises but values greatly as he teaches her how statistics work and what its components are.

The seventh and final chapter focuses on statistical hypothesis tests, which Rui manages to overcome. She prepares herself to go meet Mr. Igarashi, only for Mr. Yamamoto to reveal that he is on honeymoon vacation. Thinking that her lessons were for nothing, she accidentally stumbles into him, knocking his glasses off to reveal his handsome face. Finding him pretty, she decides to keep having lessons with him.

== The Manga Guide to Regression Analysis ==
This 235-page guide contains four chapters, as well as a prologue, an appendix and index. It focuses on multiple types of Regression analysis, from simple regression to multiple regression.

Miu, a shy waitress working at Café Norns, has developed feelings for a mathematics student regularly visiting the café, which gets her teased by her colleague, Risa. One day, as the café closes, Risa notices that the student has left his book, which is about regression analysis. Seeing this as an opportunity to get closer to the student, Miu asks Risa to take lessons from her about the subject, which Risa agrees to.

After the final lesson, which is about Logistic regression, Miu tearfully confesses to have seen Risa talking to the student at the mall, with the student soon revealed to be Risa's cousin, Hiroto. After some encouragement from Risa, Miu and Hiroto introduce themselves to each other and start dating.

== The Manga Guide to Electricity ==
This 207-page guide consists of five chapters, excluding the preface, prologue, and epilogue. It explains fundamental concepts in the study of electricity, including Ohm's law and Fleming's rules. There are written explanations after each manga chapter. An index and two pages to write notes on are provided.

The story begins with Rereko, an average high-school student who lives in Electopia (the land of electricity), failing her final electricity exam. She was forced to skip her summer vacation and go to Earth for summer school. The high school teacher Teteka sensei gave her a "transdimensional walkie-talkie and observation robot" named Yonosuke, which she uses to go back and forth to Earth. Rereko then met her mentor Hikaru, who did Electrical Engineering Research at a university in Tokyo, Japan. Hikaru explained to Rereko the basic components of electricity with occasional humorous moments.

In the fifth chapter, Hikaru tells Rereko her studies are over. Yonosuke soon received Electopia's call to pick Rereko up. Hikaru told her that he learned a lot from teaching her, and she should keep at it, even back on Electopia. Rereko told Hikaru to keep working on his research and clean his room often. Her sentence was interrupted, and she was transported back to her hometown.

A year later, Hikaru was waiting at the university bus stop. Suddenly, lightning struck his laboratory. He ran to it and found Rereko waiting inside. Rereko told him she graduated, and Teteka assigned her to work at the university as a research assistant, which makes Hikaru and Rereko lab partners.

== The Manga Guide to Physics ==
This 232-page book covers the physics of common objects. It consists of 4 chapters, excluding the preface, prologue, epilogue, appendix, and index. The artist is Keita Takatsu, and the scenario writer is re_akino. The plot revolves around Megumi Ninomiya, an athletic girl, and Ryota Nonomura, a physics Olympics silver medalist.

Megumi was bothered by physics. On the test, she circled an incorrect answer on a question involving Newton's third law. The question bothered her during her tennis match with her competitor Sayaka, causing her to be unable to concentrate.

When Megumi was cleaning up after the match, she was suddenly hit by a tennis ball. Ryota meant to help throw the ball into the basket, but he was uncoordinated. Megumi told him about her concern about the test question, and asked him to help her understand physics, and he agreed.

After many lectures about momentum, Newton's third law, and other physics concepts, Megumi is ready for a rematch with Sayaka. This time, Megumi won. Sayaka asked Megumi if she could be her partner for the next doubles match, and she agreed.

== The Manga Guide to Molecular Biology ==
Ami and Rin did not attend enough lessons to pass biology, causing them to have to attend summer school. They were instructed to visit their professor, Dr. Moro's island. There, they met Dr. Moro's assistant Marcus, who taught them lessons on the fundamentals of molecular biology with the dream machine.

After their studies ended, Ami and Rin found out that Dr. Moro had an incurable disease. The professor intended to use a hibernation machine to wait until new technologies were developed. Ami and Rin decided to be doctors and try to cure the disease. Numerous years later, Dr. Moro was cured, and he, Marcus, Ami, and Rin were shown having a toast together.
