= Andrew Huang =

Andrew Huang may refer to:

- Andrew Huang (hacker) (born 1975), American hacker
- Andrew Huang (musician) (born 1984), Canadian musician
- Andrew Thomas Huang, Chinese-American artist and director
