= The Lego Animation Book =

2016 book on stop-motion animation

- Author: David Pagano; David Pickett
- Language: English
- Publisher: No Starch Press
- Publication date: October 2016
- Pages: 216
- ISBN: 978-1-59327-741-3

The Lego Animation Book: Make Your Own Lego Movies! is a 2016 book written by David Pagano and David Pickett as an instruction manual for brickfilming. It was published by No Starch Press.

== Content ==
The book is a how-to guide on the basics of brickfilming, covering many topics such as set building, equipment, and professional editing.

== Reception ==
Kirkus Reviews rated the book positively, stating "look no further: this is the book that will launch your career…or at least give you a good beginning." The Midwest Book Review also reviewed the book positively.
