= Jonathan Haeber =

American historian

Jonathan Haeber (born 14 Dec, 1981) is an American author, photographer, and guerrilla historian. Haeber's photographs of the vacant built environment have been called "gorgeous", and "haunting."

As a self-proclaimed urban explorer, Haeber is frequently cited under his pseudonym, Tunnelbug, though - unlike many urban explorers who endeavor to maintain secrecy - his real name is often used in the media.

== Early life ==
Haeber grew up a Jehovah's Witness in Roseburg, Oregon. He came to the University of California, Berkeley for college in 2000 and held a part-time job as a night security guard where he discovered his love of exploring the built environment. There he developed a scholarly interest in architectural analysis, citing who he calls the "savant of the built environment," J.B. Jackson, a major influence. At Berkeley, he embarked on his first major project, an artistic history of miniature golf, which was later self-published. In 2013, Haeber completed his M.A. in History with a certificate in Public History from the University of Massachusetts Amherst.

== Published works ==
=== Bearings ===
Upon leaving college, Haeber founded Bearings, initially a repository for anecdotes about the architecture he explored but later home to an eclectic variety of musings by various freelance contributors on landscape, culture, and history. In 2009, Haeber decided to release all of his intellectual property on Bearings under the Creative Commons license, writing in his announcement: "I only hope you can put [my images] to good use, perhaps understand my intention, and even make them your own in some small way, because – really – that’s what it means to be human."

=== "Neverland at Night" Series ===
In December 2007, Haeber spent three moonlit nights at the famed pleasure park of Michael Jackson, Neverland Ranch, photographing its attractions prior to their liquidation and dismantlement. The journey was initially spent alone, but he later brought artist Scott Haefner on subsequent trips. The two used improvised lighting (a technique known as "light painting"), large format film, and long exposures to capture Neverland. Images appeared in print, online, and in gallery showings. Kelly Seldan, curator of the "Neverland at Night" exhibit in Los Angeles said the "colorful images of Michael's whimsical park-rides and artwork lit by the moon and carefully focused spotlights express the melancholy of an abandoned world -- one that was meant for joy and laughter. What started out as an adventure to capture history resulted in a dramatic yet sensitive reflection on the wonder of Neverland and the hope and happiness Michael Jackson meant to create through the park."

=== Steve Jobs' Mansion ===
In May 2009, Haeber’s images of Steve Jobs’ abandoned mansion in Woodside, California were posted on author Leander Kahney’s site, Cult of Mac. The images, which were reportedly taken in 2006, were later published on CNN, CNET, the Australian Financial Review, AppleInsider, and the Sydney Morning Herald. CNN said the images were "rare glimpses inside the house that Jobs hates." In 2011, Jobs demolished the historic mansion, and Haeber’s images are among the few extant records of its interior spaces.

=== Grossinger's Book ===
Published in November 2011, Grossinger's: City of Refuge and Illusion was marketed by publisher Furnace Press as a "scholarly quest" into the history of an abandoned Borscht Belt resort in the heart of the Catskills. Dr. Phil Brown, author of Catskill Culture, said the book shows "an important slice of Jewish culture...accompanied by the riotous color palettes generated by decay, rain, and time." Renowned night photographer, Troy Paiva, called the book "A love letter to culture and history lost, and a chronicle of an adventurous journey into a forgotten world few ever get to see."

=== Mothball Fleet Announcement and Controversy ===
In May 2011, Haeber, along with artists Scott Haefner and Stephen Freskos presented a series of images of the Suisun Bay naval reserve fleet, affectionately known as the Mothball Fleet. The trio’s event was held at Workspace Limited in San Francisco, and was followed by appearances in the Daily Mirror, San Francisco Bay Guardian, New York Magazine, and Oakland Tribune. Articles alluded to the fact that the artists were under the watchful eye of the feds, and speculation ensued as to the consequences of their "illegal" visits to the fleet. Scott Haefner noted visits to his site from the Department of Justice, Navy, and Department of Transportation, but there are no reports of any arrests being made in connection with the mothball fleet series of images.

== Quotes ==
"My purpose, as a photographer, is to capture places that have rarely, if ever, been photographed so at least there is some kind of record of their existence."

"In those innocent moments I truly discovered a different world inside of a tiny little train station among the once-prosperous anthracite valley of Pennsylvania."

"I've realized that it's much easier to just walk in and take pictures and deal with it later."

"We would never know what a building looked like if nobody had taken photos of it... It tells us something about our heritage and our culture."
