= Crowd Supply =

Crowd Supply, Inc.
- Website type: Crowdfunding
- Headquarters: Portland, Oregon, U.S.
- Founder: Lou Doctor
- CEO: Josh Lifton
- Parent: Mouser Electronics
- Website: crowdsupply.com
- Launched: 2012

Crowd Supply is a crowdfunding platform based in Portland, Oregon. The platform has claimed "over twice the success rate of Kickstarter and Indiegogo", and partners with creators who use it, providing mentorship resembling a business incubator.

Some see Crowd Supply's close management of projects as the solution to the fulfillment failure rate of other crowdfunding platforms. The site also serves as an online store for the inventories of successful campaigns.

Notable projects from the platform include Andrew Huang's Novena, an open-source laptop.

== Endorsement by Free Software Foundation ==
In 2015, Crowd Supply became compliant with the Free Software Foundation's Free JavaScript campaign and was endorsed as the FSF's preferred crowdfunding platform.

== See also ==
- Crowdfunding
- Novena
- Librem
- BusKill
