= Ross Ulbricht =

American cybercriminal founder of Silk Road (born 1984)

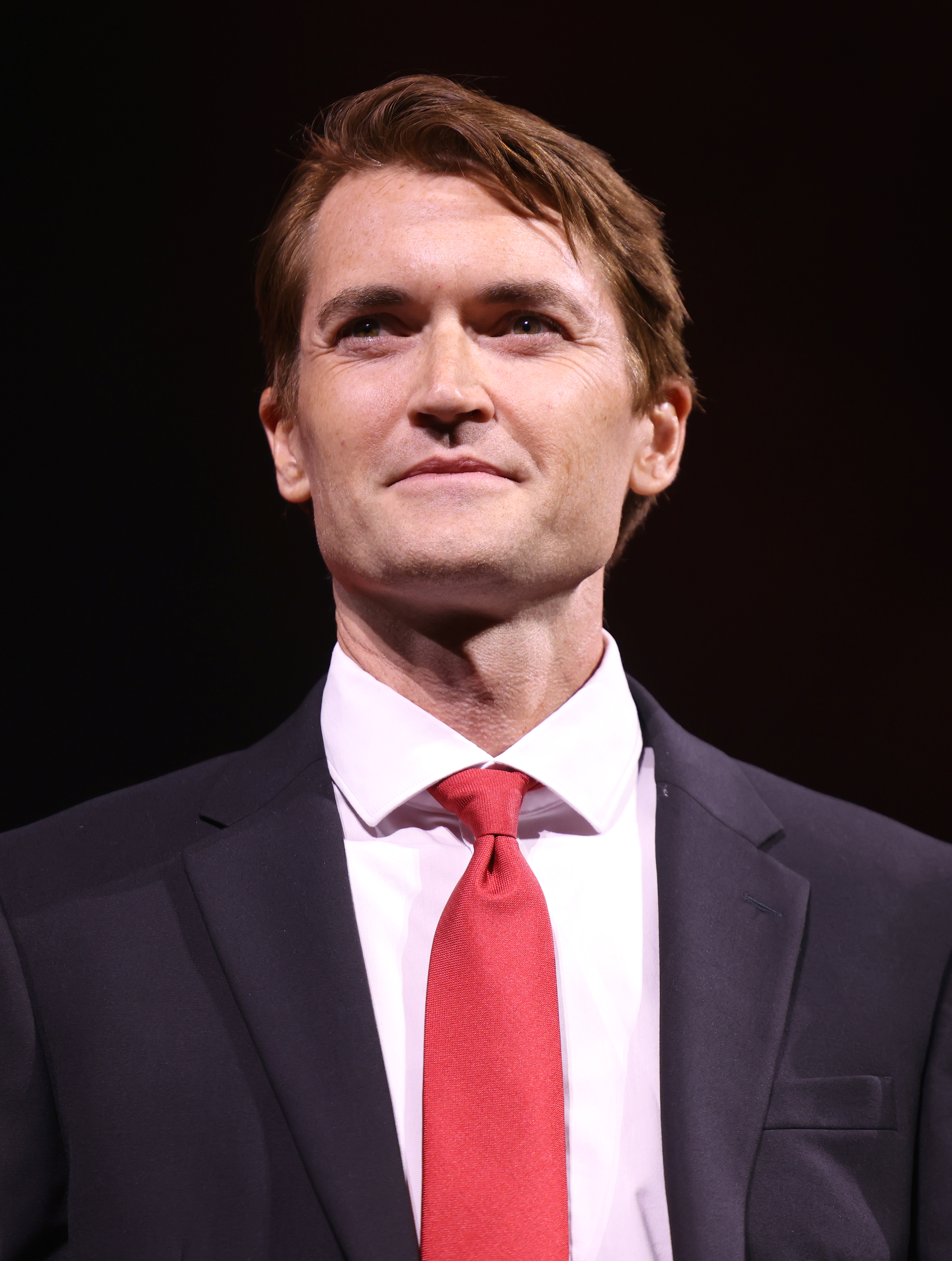
- Ulbricht in 2025
- Born: Ross William Ulbricht; March 27, 1984 (age 42); Austin, Texas, U.S.
- Other names: Dread Pirate Roberts; Frosty; Altoid
- Education: University of Texas, Dallas (BS); Pennsylvania State University (MS)
- Known for: Founder of Silk Road
- Criminal penalty: Life imprisonment without the possibility of parole
- Criminal status: Pardoned by Donald Trump on January 21, 2025
- Spouse: Caroline

Ross William Ulbricht (/ˈʊlbrɪkt/; born March 27, 1984) is an American cybercriminal who created and operated Silk Road, the first modern darknet market, from 2011 until his arrest in 2013. Silk Road was an online marketplace that facilitated the trade in narcotics and other illegal products and services. Sales were anonymous, using bitcoin. It operated as a hidden service on the Tor network. Ulbricht ran the site under the pseudonym "Dread Pirate Roberts" after the fictional character from The Princess Bride.

In October 2013, the Federal Bureau of Investigation (FBI) arrested Ulbricht and took Silk Road offline. In 2015, he was convicted of engaging in a continuing criminal enterprise, distributing narcotics by means of the internet, conspiracy to commit money laundering, conspiracy to traffic fraudulent identity documents, and conspiracy to commit computer hacking. He was sentenced to two life sentences plus 40 years without the possibility of parole, to be served concurrently. Evidence that Ulbricht had commissioned murder-for-hire deals for at least five people was considered at his sentencing hearing, though he was not charged with this crime. Ulbricht's appeals to the U.S. Court of Appeals for the Second Circuit in 2017 and the U.S. Supreme Court in 2018 were unsuccessful. After serving 11 years, he was released from prison in January 2025, when he received a full and unconditional pardon from U.S. president Donald Trump.

== Early life ==
Ulbricht was born and raised in Austin, Texas. He was a Boy Scout, attaining the rank of Eagle Scout. He attended West Ridge Middle School and Westlake High School both in the Eanes Independent School District in the suburbs of Austin, graduating from high school in 2002.

Ulbricht attended the University of Texas at Dallas on a full academic scholarship and graduated in 2006 with a bachelor's degree in physics. Ulbricht received an additional scholarship to attend Pennsylvania State University, where he was in a master's degree program in materials science and engineering and studied crystallography. By the time Ulbricht graduated from his master's degree program, he had become interested in libertarian economic theory and adhered to the political philosophy of Ludwig von Mises, supported Ron Paul, promoted agorism, and participated in college debates to discuss his economic views. Ulbricht graduated from Penn State in 2009 and returned to Austin. He tried day trading and started a video game company, but neither venture succeeded. He eventually partnered with his friend Donny Palmertree to help build an online used bookseller, Good Wagon Books.

== Silk Road ==
Palmertree, cofounder of Good Wagon Books, eventually moved to Dallas, leaving Ulbricht to run the bookseller by himself. Around this time, Ulbricht began planning Silk Road (initially called Underground Brokers). In his personal diary, he outlined his idea for a website "where people could buy anything anonymously, with no trail whatsoever that could lead back to them". Ulbricht's ex-girlfriend said, "I remember when he had the idea ... He said something about ... the Silk Road in Asia ... and what a big network it was ... And that's what he wanted to create, so he thought it was the perfect name." Ulbricht alluded to Silk Road on his public LinkedIn page, where he discussed his wish to "use economic theory as a means to abolish the use of coercion and aggression amongst mankind" and claimed, "I am creating an economic simulation to give people a first-hand experience of what it would be like to live in a world without the systemic use of force."

Silk Road ran as an onion service on the Tor network, which implements data encryption and routes traffic through intermediary servers to anonymize the source and destination Internet Protocol addresses. By hosting his market as a Tor site, Ulbricht could conceal the server's IP address and, thus, its location. Bitcoin, a cryptocurrency, was used for transactions on the site. While all bitcoin transactions were recorded in a public ledger called the blockchain, users who avoided linking their legal names to their cryptocurrency wallets were able to conduct transactions with considerable anonymity. Ulbricht used the "Dread Pirate Roberts" username for Silk Road, although it is disputed whether only he used that account. He attributed his inspiration for creating the Silk Road marketplace to the novel Alongside Night and the works of Samuel Edward Konkin III.

== Arrest and trial ==
=== Initial arrest ===
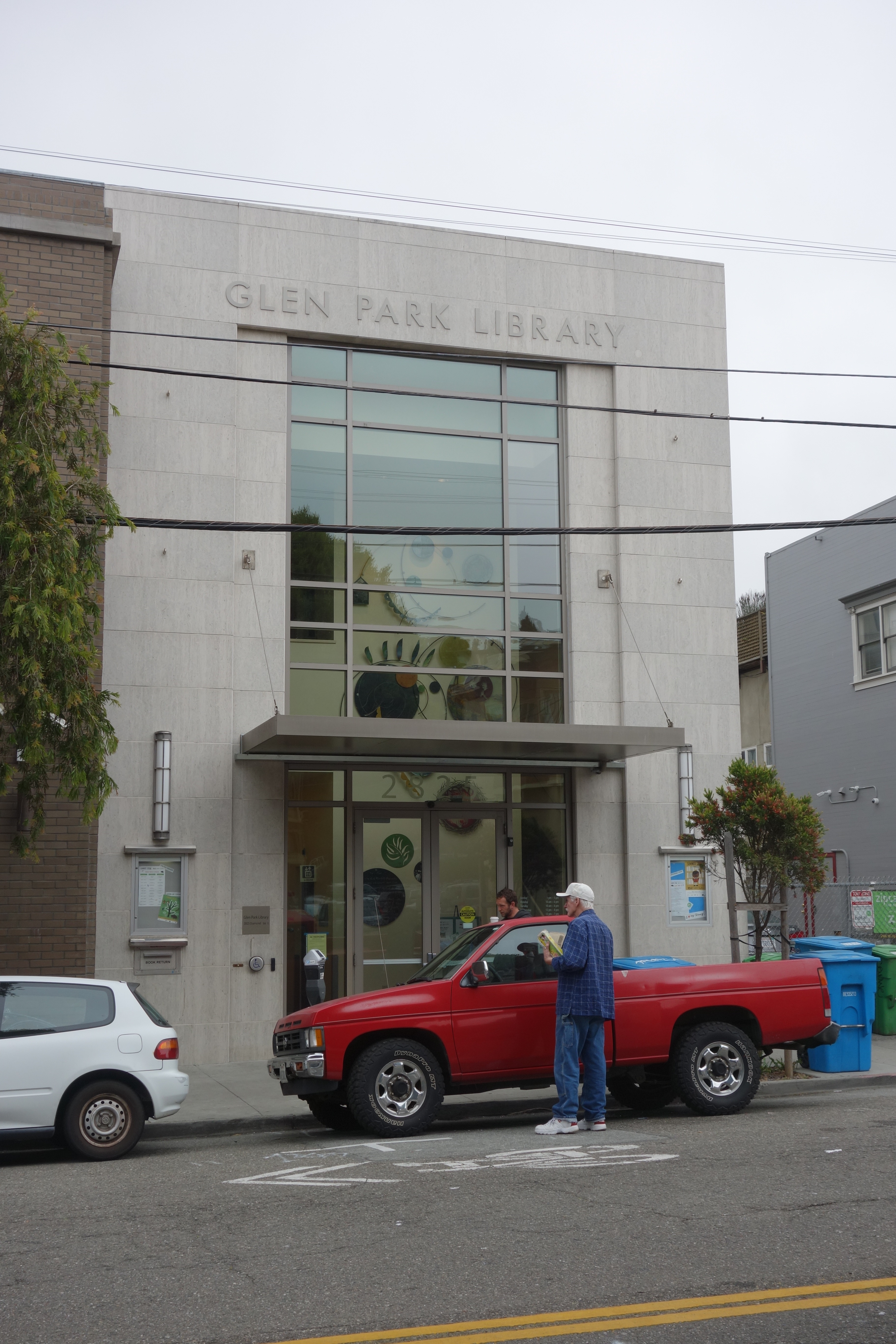
The Glen Park branch of the San Francisco Public Library, where Ulbricht was arrested by the Federal Bureau of Investigation

Law enforcement broke Silk Road's cover in a number of ways. A drug agency investigator infiltrated the site and became an admin, gaining inside information about the site operations. He found Ulbricht's chats showed Pacific time, narrowing down his likely location. Law enforcement seized a Silk Road server in Iceland. The identity of "Dread Pirate Roberts" was traced to Ulbricht by Gary Alford, an Internal Revenue Service investigator working with the Drug Enforcement Administration (DEA) on the Silk Road case, in mid-2013. Alford was led to Ulbricht's true identity via the username "altoid"; Ulbricht used this name during Silk Road's early days to announce the website, as well as on a forum post in which he asked for programming help and gave his email address, which contained his full name. On October 1, 2013, the FBI arrested Ulbricht at the Glen Park branch of the San Francisco Public Library and accused him of being the "mastermind" behind the site.

To prevent Ulbricht from encrypting or deleting files on the laptop he was using to run the site as he was arrested, two agents pretended to be quarreling lovers. When they had sufficiently distracted him, according to Joshuah Bearman of Wired, they quickly moved in to arrest him while a third agent grabbed the laptop and handed it to agent Thomas Kiernan. Kiernan then inserted a flash drive into one of the laptop's USB ports, with software that copied key files. Ulbricht was ordered held without bail.

=== Court proceedings ===
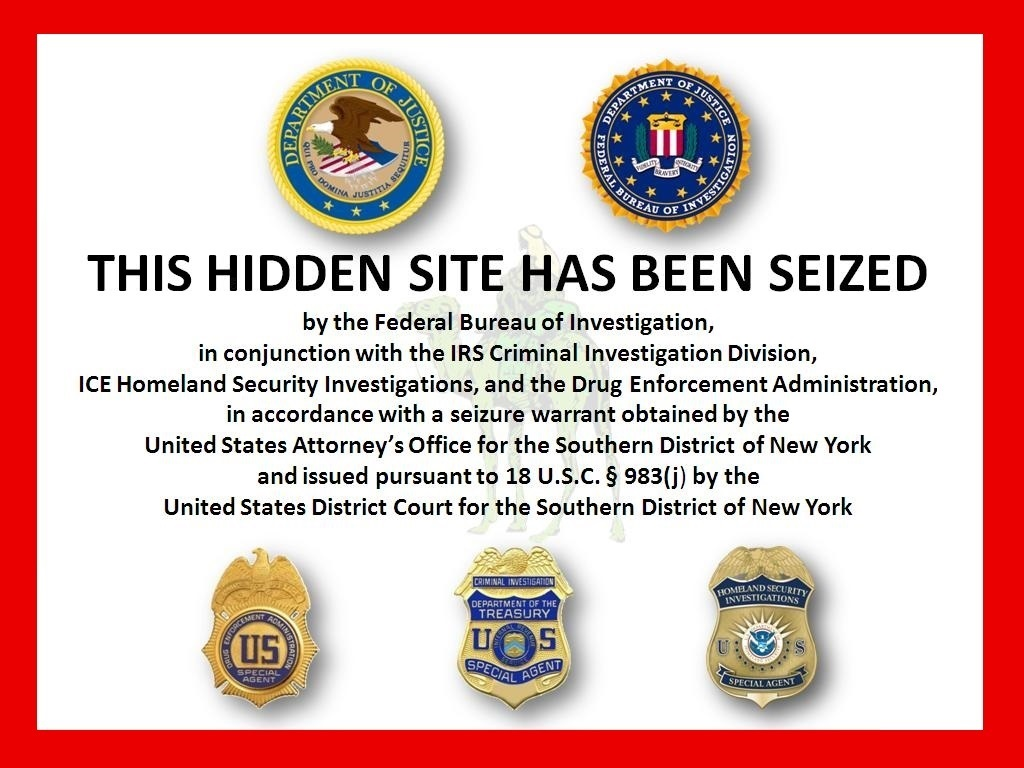
Image placed on Silk Road after seizure by the FBI

On February 4, 2014, Ulbricht was charged with engaging in a continuing criminal enterprise, narcotics conspiracy, conspiracy to commit money laundering, and conspiracy to commit computer hacking. On August 21, 2014, a superseding indictment added three additional charges. The trial began on January 13, 2015.

=== Murder-for-hire charges ===
Federal prosecutors alleged that Ulbricht had paid US$730,000 (equivalent to about $1,010,000 in 2025) in murder-for-hire deals targeting at least five people, allegedly because they threatened to reveal the Silk Road enterprise. Prosecutors believe no contracted killing actually occurred. Ulbricht was not charged in his trial in New York federal court with murder for hire, but evidence was introduced at trial supporting the allegations. The district court found by a preponderance of the evidence that Ulbricht probably commissioned the murders. The possibility that Ulbricht had commissioned murders was considered by the judge in sentencing Ulbricht to life and was a factor in the Second Circuit's decision to uphold the sentence. Ulbricht was separately indicted in federal court in Maryland on a single murder-for-hire charge, alleging that he contracted to kill one of his employees (a former Silk Road moderator). Prosecutors moved to drop this indictment after his New York conviction and sentence became final.

=== Conviction and sentence ===
On February 4, 2015, Ulbricht was convicted on all counts after a jury trial that had taken place in January 2015. On May 29, 2015, he was sentenced to double life imprisonment plus 40 years, without the possibility of parole, to be served concurrently. Ulbricht was also ordered to pay about US$183 million ($249 million in 2025 dollars) in restitution, based on the total sales of illegal drugs and counterfeit IDs through Silk Road. Following his conviction, two of the federal agents who participated in the investigation were arrested and charged with wire fraud and money laundering. As the corruption was never mentioned at his trial, Ulbricht unsuccessfully used it as an argument when appealing for a new trial.

== Post-conviction ==
=== Incarceration ===
During his trial, Ulbricht was incarcerated at the Metropolitan Correctional Center, New York. Starting in July 2017, he was held at USP Florence High. His mother, Lyn, moved to Colorado so she could visit him regularly. Ulbricht was later transferred to USP Tucson.

=== Appeal attempts ===
Oral argument in United States v. Ulbricht at the U.S. Court of Appeals for the Second Circuit

Ulbricht appealed his conviction and sentence to the U.S. Court of Appeals for the Second Circuit in January 2016, claiming that the prosecution illegally withheld evidence of DEA agents' malfeasance in the investigation of Silk Road, of which two agents were convicted. Ulbricht also argued his sentence was too harsh. Oral arguments were heard in October 2016, and the Second Circuit issued its decision in May 2017, upholding Ulbricht's conviction and sentence in an opinion by Judge Gerard E. Lynch. In a 139-page opinion, the court affirmed the district court's denial of Ulbricht's motion to suppress certain evidence, affirmed the district court's decisions on discovery and the admission of expert testimony, and rejected Ulbricht's argument that a life sentence was procedurally or substantively unreasonable.

In December 2017, Ulbricht filed a petition for certiorari with the U.S. Supreme Court, asking the Court to hear his appeal on evidentiary and sentencing issues. Ulbricht's petition asked whether the warrantless seizure of an individual's internet traffic information, without probable cause, violated the Fourth Amendment, and whether the Sixth Amendment permits judges to find facts necessary to support an otherwise unreasonable sentence. Twenty-one amici filed five amicus curiae briefs in support of Ulbricht, including the National Lawyers Guild, American Black Cross, Reason Foundation, Drug Policy Alliance, and Downsize DC Foundation. The U.S. government filed a response in opposition to Ulbricht's petition. On June 28, 2018, the Supreme Court denied the petition, declining to consider Ulbricht's appeal.

In a 2020 Vanity Fair article, it was asserted that Ulbricht had rejected a plea deal that would have potentially given him a decade-long sentence, stating that "According to more than a dozen investigators and attorneys involved in the case ... Ulbricht's sentence could have been a lot less severe." However, while Assistant U.S. Attorney Timothy Howard, who was co-responsible for prosecuting the case, stated that a plea deal with a mandatory minimum of 10 years was "discussed at the final pretrial conference on December 17, 2014", the maximum sentence of life imprisonment was strongly recommended based on the sentencing guideline and testified that "no such plea offer was ever extended to Ross William Ulbricht, or conveyed to his then-counsel" before Ulbricht's indictment.

=== Calls for commutation ===
After Ross's arrest, his mother, Lyn Ulbricht, initiated a campaign for a sentence review and early release. The "Free Ross" movement quickly spread through social media, merchandise, and a petition with over 600,000 signatures. Over the years, the campaign found support from libertarian politicians, prison reform advocates, and members of the cryptocurrency community, who view Ulbricht as a Bitcoin pioneer who helped spread Bitcoin use through his website. In May 2022, the Libertarian Republican Congressman Thomas Massie called for a commutation of Ulbricht's conviction. The libertarian-oriented Reason Foundation attempted to raise funds, citing Ulbricht's case, without taking any legal action, and 2020 Libertarian Party presidential candidate Jo Jorgensen made a campaign pledge to pardon Ulbricht.

In May 2024, candidate Donald Trump said that if re-elected President, he would commute Ulbricht's sentence on his first day in office.

=== Restitution paid ===
In 2021, Ulbricht's prosecutors and defense agreed that Ulbricht would relinquish any ownership of a newly discovered fund of 50,676 Bitcoin (worth nearly US$5.35 billion in 2025) seized from a hacker in November 2021. The Bitcoin had been stolen from Silk Road in 2013, and Ulbricht had been unsuccessful in getting them back. The U.S. government traced and seized the stolen Bitcoin. Ulbricht and the government agreed the fund would be used to pay off Ulbricht's US$183 (equivalent to about $249 in 2025) million debt in his criminal case, while the Department of Justice would take custody of the Bitcoin.

=== Anonymous Bitcoin gift ===
In June 2025, a Wired article written by Andy Greenberg reported that Ulbricht had received an anonymous gift of 300 Bitcoin (worth approximately $31.4 million at the time of the gift). Some speculated that Ulbricht had covertly given himself this gift from Bitcoin he had hidden away before he went to prison. However, citing research by Chainalysis, a blockchain analysis firm, Greenberg reported that the 300-bitcoin donation had likely come from someone associated with AlphaBay, a darknet market that, like Silk Road, had been shut down.

== Presidential pardon and release ==
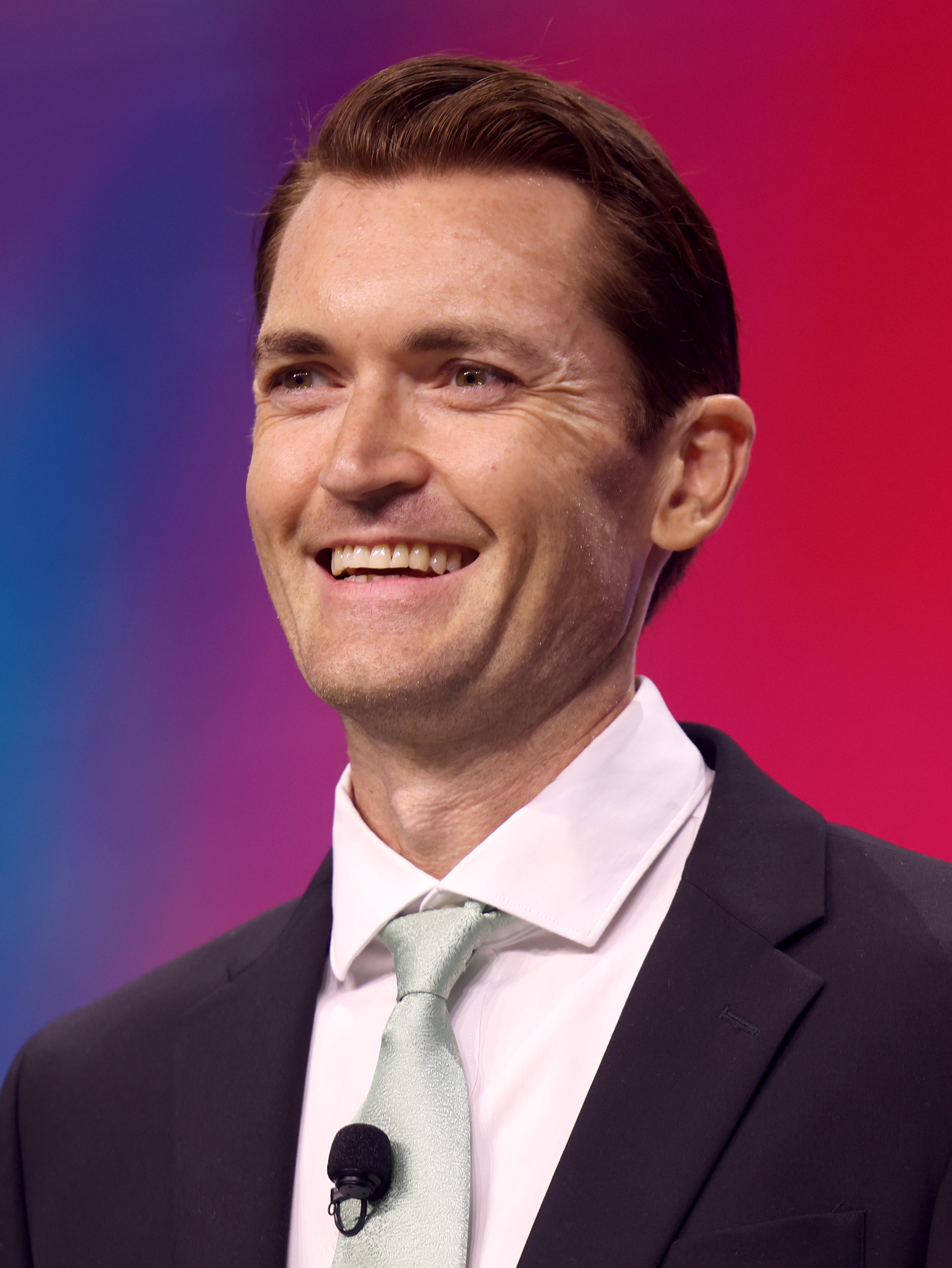
Ulbricht in 2025

On January 21, 2025, U.S. president Donald Trump granted Ulbricht a full and unconditional pardon, following a promise at the 2024 Libertarian National Convention. According to an article in the New Yorker, Ulbricht's pardon was the result of a political bargain: "In late 2023, as Mr. Trump ramped up his presidential campaign, he met Angela McArdle, the Libertarian Party's leader, who told him that he could win the Libertarian vote if he promised to release Mr. Ulbricht."

Trump's pardon of Ulbricht was criticized by some in the press. The Nation wrote of the pardon: "It's an especially telling irony given that Trump has also repeatedly advocated the death penalty for convicted drug dealers — and it's doubtful anyone within the United States has trafficked in drugs on the scale that Ulbricht has."

Ulbricht later gave a speech about this pardon at the 2026 Republican National Convention.

== Other ventures ==
=== Good Wagon Books ===
In 2010, Ulbricht partnered with his friend Donny Palmertree to help build an online used bookseller, Good Wagon Books. Following the departure of Palmertree, he continued to operate the business as CEO until March 2011.

=== 2021 NFT sale ===
Ulbricht's family raised money for efforts to release him from prison via the decentralized autonomous organization FreeRossDAO, which accepted donations from the public. In December 2021, the family auctioned a collection of his writings and artwork as an NFT, which FreeRossDAO bought for 1,442 Ethereum, worth about 6 million USD.

== Personal life ==
The son of Kirk and Lyn Ulbricht, Ross has a sister, Cally, who was residing in Australia at the time of his arrest, and a half-brother, Travis. His parents were reported to earn most of their income from renting out beachside vacation homes in Costa Rica. During his incarceration, his mother became a prominent campaigner for his release.

While studying at the University of Texas at Dallas, Ulbricht reportedly became engaged. However, he ended the relationship after discovering that his girlfriend had cheated on him with a close friend. During his graduate studies at Penn State, he began a relationship with Julia Vie, then a freshman student at the university. Vie moved with Ulbricht to Austin after he received his master's degree, but she stated that his lack of interest in social activities while he was building Silk Road led to their breakup. In an effort to rekindle the relationship, she visited him in San Francisco shortly before his arrest.

Ulbricht is married. In May 2026, Ross and his wife, Caroline, announced that they are expecting a baby.

Following his release from prison, he expressed gratitude to his mother and wife for their efforts in campaigning for his freedom. Ulbricht identifies as a libertarian. He was in a relationship with Julia Vie from 2008 to 2013.

== In popular culture ==
- Deep Web, a 2015 documentary film chronicling events surrounding Silk Road, bitcoin, and the politics of the dark web, including Ulbricht's trial. Silk Road—Drugs, Death and the Dark Web, a documentary covering the FBI operation to track down Ulbricht and close Silk Road. The documentary was shown on UK television in 2017 in the BBC Storyville documentary series.
- Silk Road, a 2021 American film directed by Tiller Russell. It follows Ulbricht's creation of the website and the FBI and DEA investigations. Ulbricht is portrayed by American actor Nick Robinson.

== See also ==
- Variety Jones and Smedley – pseudonyms of people reported to have been closely involved with Silk Road's founding
- USBKill – kill-switch software created in response to the circumstances of Ulbricht's arrest
- List of people granted executive clemency in the second Trump presidency
- Silk Road
