= Keyfile =

A keyfile (or key-file) is a file on a computer which contains encryption or license keys.

A common use is web server software running Transport Layer Security (TLS) protocols. Server-specific keys issued by trusted authorities are merged into the keyfile along with the trusted root certificates. By this method keys can be updated without recompiling software or rebooting the server.

A keyfile is often part of a public key infrastructure (PKI).

Some applications use a keyfile to hold licensing information, which is periodically reviewed to ensure currency and compliance. Other applications allow users to merge multiple service-specific security settings into a single common store (for example, Apple Computer's Keychain in later Mac OS X versions, GNOME Keyring and KWallet in the GNOME and KDE environments in Linux, respectively).

== See also ==
- License manager
- List of license managers
- Passphrase
- Encryption software
- Product activation
- Digital rights management
