= The Cult of Mac =

2004 book by Leander Kahney

- Author: Leander Kahney
- Language: English
- Subject: Computing
- Genre: Non-fiction
- Publisher: No Starch Press
- Publication date: November 2004
- Publication place: United States
- Media type: Print (hardcover, paperback)
- Pages: 260ppc
- ISBN: 1-59327-122-0
- OCLC: 76757169
- Followed by: The Cult of iPod

The Cult of Mac is a book by Leander Kahney. The book discusses fanaticism about the Apple product line and the company's brand loyalty. Kahney released a later book titled The Cult of iPod.

The cover of the book features the Apple logo shaved into the back of a person's head.

== See also ==
- Apple evangelist
- Reality distortion field
- Criticism of Apple Inc.#Comparison with a cult
