= How Wikipedia Works =

2008 how-to reference book

How Wikipedia Works (and How You Can Be a Part of It)
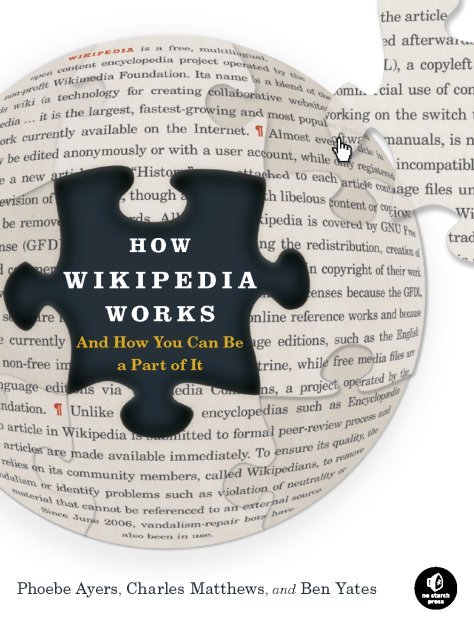
- Author: Phoebe Ayers; Charles Matthews; Ben Yates
- Publisher: No Starch Press
- Publication date: 2008
- Pages: 536
- ISBN: 9781593271763

How Wikipedia Works is a 2008 book by Phoebe Ayers, Charles Matthews, and Ben Yates. Published by No Starch Press, it is a how-to reference book for using and contributing to the Wikipedia encyclopedia, targeted at "students, professors, and everyday experts and fans". It offers specific sections for teachers, users, and researchers. It was designed as a reference work and has detailed bibliographies for each section.

== Publication ==
How Wikipedia Works (and How You Can Be a Part of It) is published by No Starch Press as part of their series of technical how-to books.

The book was originally published under the GNU Free Documentation License. At the time of publication, Wikipedia was also released under the GFDL. The book has since been re-licensed under the CC BY-SA, which Wikipedia now uses.

Phoebe Ayers about Wikipedia and the Wikimedia movement (August, 2019)

== Reception ==
The Register (UK) called it "a great one-stop source for information of the world’s go-to source for information." David Weeks of MyMac.com called it a "fine reference guide" and praised its comprehensive content, but mildly criticized the book's length. He recommended that readers start by skimming through the book and consult it later for more detailed guidance when editing.

== See also ==
- Bibliography of Wikipedia
- Wikipedia: The Missing Manual
