= Andrew Huang (hacker) =

American researcher and hacker (born 1975)

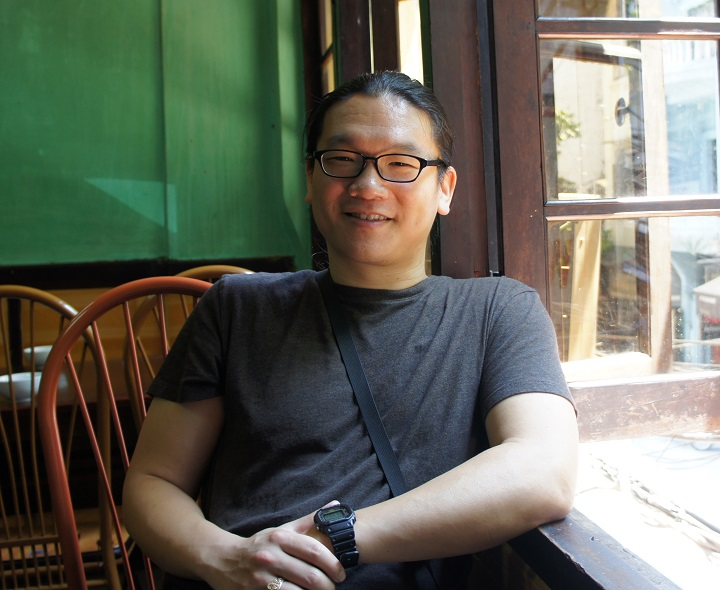
- Born: 1975 (age 50–51); Kalamazoo, Michigan
- Other name: bunnie
- Education: Massachusetts Institute of Technology
- Occupations: Hacker, author, researcher
- Known for: Chumby, Hacking the Xbox, Novena
- Website: bunniestudios.com

Andrew "bunnie" Huang (born 1975) is an American researcher and hacker, who holds a Ph.D in electrical engineering from MIT and is the author of the freely available 2003 book Hacking the Xbox: An Introduction to Reverse Engineering. As of 2012 he resides in Singapore. Huang is a member of the Zeta Beta Tau fraternity, and a resident advisor and mentor to hardware startups at HAX, an early stage hardware accelerator and venture capital firm.

== Early life and education ==
Huang was born in Kalamazoo, Michigan, United States to mainland Chinese parents who fled to Taiwan at a young age during the Chinese communist revolution. Huang's father was born in Central China. Huang's mother was born in Beijing to a Han Chinese father and a Mongol mother. Huang has two sisters and is the middle child of his family.

Huang attended the Massachusetts Institute of Technology in 1992, earning a Ph.D in electrical engineering in 2002. He stated that he had "flipped a coin" to determine whether to pursue biology or electronics.

The nickname "bunnie" is short for "vorpalbunnie", a reference to the creature in both Monty Python and the Holy Grail and Moria, that he used as a BBS screen name.

== Projects ==
Huang was the hardware lead at Chumby; his responsibilities included the design and production of Chumby devices, as well as the strategic planning and ecosystem development of the broader Chumby hardware platform.

As a leader at the Ministry of Mobile Affairs, Andrew Huang oversaw the ambitious MoMA Eve handheld game console.

He has completed several major projects, ranging from hacking the Xbox, to designing the world's first fully integrated photonic-silicon chips running at 10 Gbit/s with Luxtera, Inc., to building some of the first prototype hardware for silicon nanowire device research with Caltech. Huang has also participated in the design of Wireless transceivers for use in 802.11b and Bluetooth networks with Mobilian, graphics chips at Silicon Graphics, digital cinema codecs at Qualcomm, and autonomous robotic submarines during the 1999 competition held by the AUVSI that the MIT team won. He is also responsible for the "un-design" of many security systems, with an appetite for the challenge of digesting silicon-based hardware security.

Huang was scheduled to appear as an expert witness in the trial United States v. Crippen to determine whether or not modding an Xbox violates sections of the DMCA. The case was dropped suddenly on the third day of trial by the US federal authorities who had initiated the action, prior to the jury being seated. The case was dismissed before Huang was called to give testimony.

He also created the open hardware Safecast Geiger Counter Reference Design, as a volunteer effort in response to the 2011 Tōhoku earthquake, tsunami, and ensuing meltdown of Fukushima Daiichi. A project in collaboration with Jie Qi of the MIT Media Lab is Circuit Stickers, a peel-and-stick circuit system for crafting electronics. Huang was interviewed on Dave Jones' The Amp Hour in episode #84, where he talked about his electronics work in China and reverse engineering.

Huang is a member of the advisory board for Crowd Supply, the crowdfunding platform that he used for Novena and The Essential Guide to Electronics in Shenzhen.

He also spearheaded the Precursor project, an effort to create a secure trusted RISC-V hardware platform.

=== Reverse engineering ===
Xbox

Huang has a long and noted history with the reverse engineering and hacking of consumer products. His 2003 publication Hacking the Xbox: An Introduction to Reverse Engineering was one of the first published works regarding the reverse engineering of a high end consumer product. He faced significant legal pressure from Microsoft to not reveal the details of his exploits, and the book itself reveals that he had received a letter from MIT, where he was at the time a student, informing him of their disavowal of any association with his project. Additionally, his publisher John Wiley & Sons had rescinded their intent to publish the book.

In part because of this response by MIT to his work, when the Institute was again put at the forefront of controversy in their handling of the criminal prosecution brought against Aaron Swartz, and his subsequent suicide, Huang released the book for free through No Starch Press, remarking that "Without the right to tinker and explore, we risk becoming enslaved by technology; and the more we exercise the right to hack, the harder it will be to take that right away".

Printer steganography

In 2005, Huang worked with a team from the Electronic Frontier Foundation to develop code that interprets printer steganography markings.

Digital Content Protection

Huang created the NeTV in 2011, which was the first known public use of the High-bandwidth Digital Content Protection (HDCP) "master key". The device uses the master key to implement a video overlay on existing HDCP-protected links, in a fashion which purportedly does not violate the DMCA. Both the hardware and firmware for the NeTV are openly available under the CC BY-SA license.

MicroSD card vulnerabilities

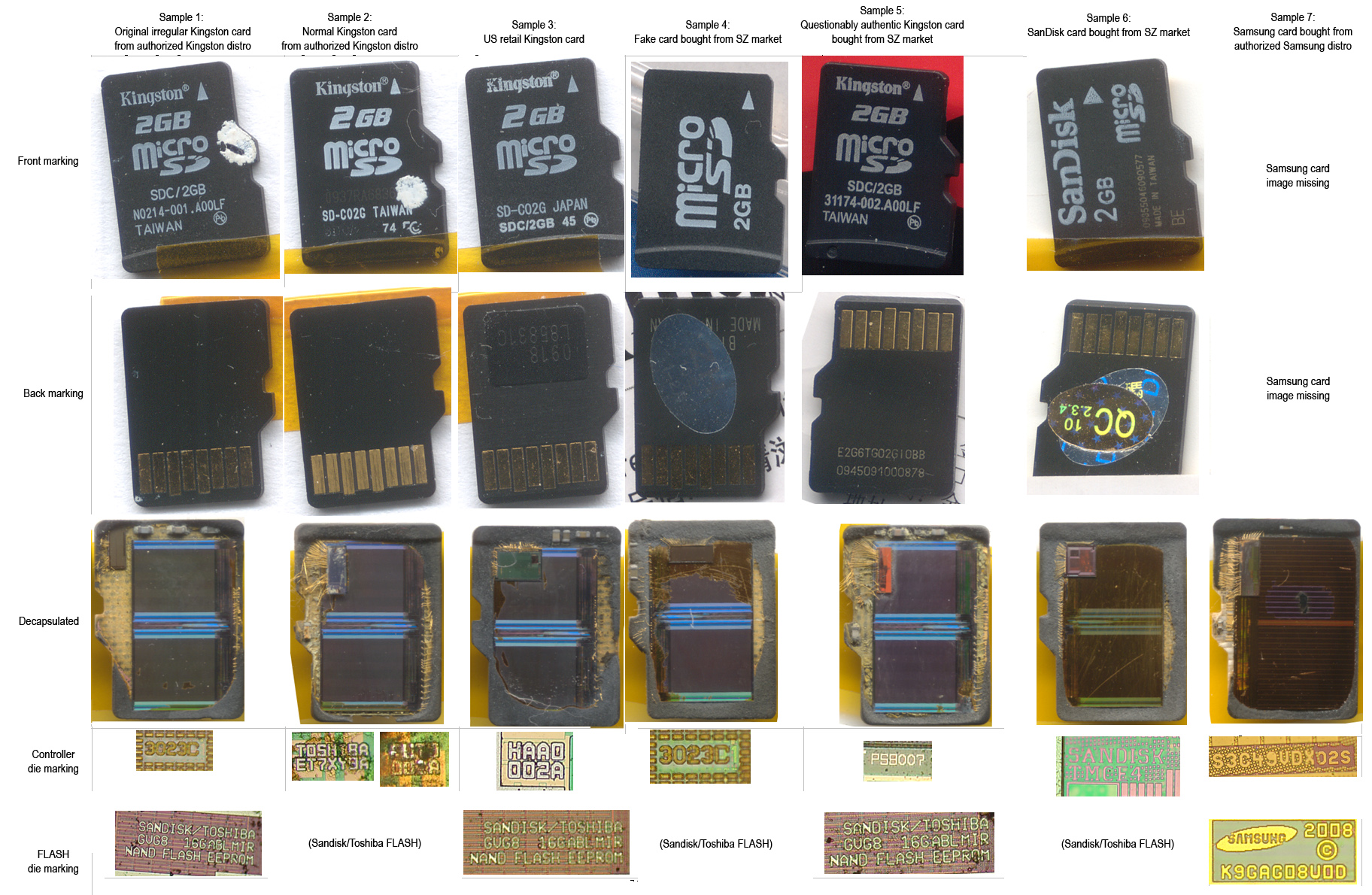
microSD cards: genuine & questionable

He has also used reverse engineering techniques to reveal why certain MicroSD cards are poor in quality. In 2013, he presented results in collaboration with fellow Singapore developer Sean "xobs" Cross revealing methods to load arbitrary code into microSD cards via backdoors built into the embedded controller.

Cell phone privacy

On 21 July 2016, Huang and Edward Snowden, in a talk at MIT Media Lab's Forbidden Research event, published research for an outboard computer embedded in a smartphone case, the so-called "Introspection Engine", that would monitor electrical signals received and sent by that phone, to provide an alert to the user, if their phone is transmitting or receiving information when it shouldn't be (for example, when it's turned off or in airplane mode), a feature described by Snowden to be useful for journalists or activists operating under hostile governments that would want to track their activities through their phones.

=== Novena ===
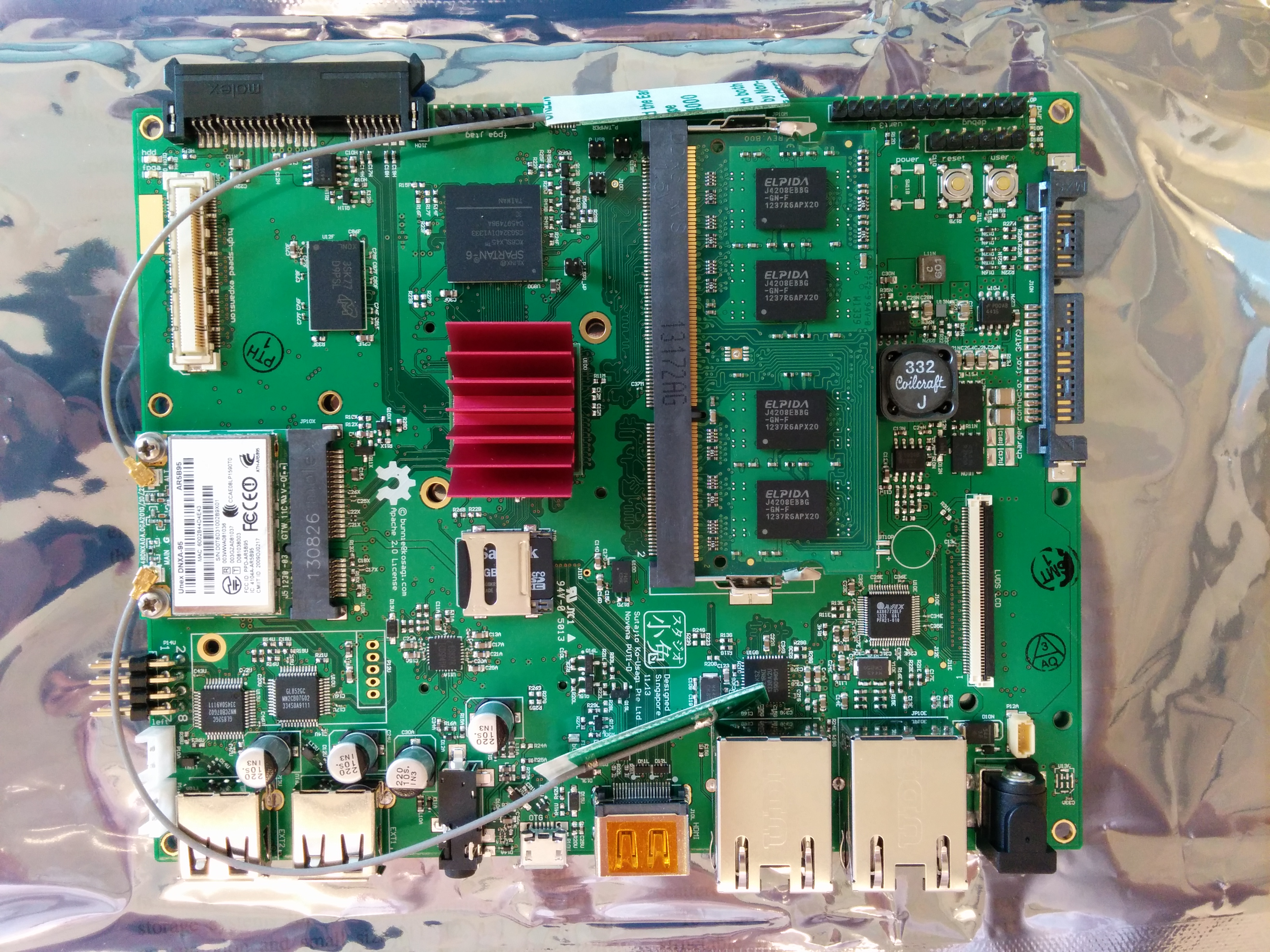
The open-source hardware laptop motherboard, Novena

In 2013, Huang announced that he, again in collaboration with Cross, was at work developing a laptop called the Novena. The laptop is the first of its kind, in that the hardware and software are entirely open and only include components where the manufacturing companies do not require non-disclosure agreements to obtain the documentation necessary for design. In addition to the normal laptop components, the Novena motherboard also includes an FPGA, dual Ethernet ports, a three-axis accelerometer, and easily augmentable hardware. On May 7, 2014 the Novena's crowdfunding campaign reached its goal of $250,000 and went on to raise a total of $722,880 without taking subsequent pre-orders into account.

=== Writing ===
Huang is a contributing writer for MAKE magazine, as well as being a member of their technical advisory board. He has also written for Gizmodo and IEEE Spectrum.

He has also written extensively about manufacturing in China. In March 2016, Huang successfully completed the crowdfunding campaign for his book The Essential Guide to Electronics in Shenzhen, a manual written to enable the English-speaking electronics community to be able to navigate China's Huaqiangbei marketplace in Shenzhen, widely regarded as one of the world's premier electronics marketplaces and production hubs. He also appeared in Wired's 2016 documentary Inside Shenzhen: The Silicon Valley of hardware.

He also has published The Hardware Hacker, a collection of personal essays on hardware hacking

=== DMCA lawsuit ===
In July 2016, Huang became a plaintiff in a lawsuit filed by the Electronic Frontier Foundation (EFF) that challenges the Digital Millennium Copyright Act (DMCA). In the complaint, the EFF argue on behalf of Huang (and his company AlphaMax LLC.) that the "anti-circumvention" and "anti-trafficking" provisions of Section 1201 of the Digital Millennium Copyright Act threaten free speech. The lawsuit, Green v. Department of Justice, is shared with plaintiff Matthew D. Green, a cryptography researcher whose work has a similar obstacle within Section 1201.

Huang and AlphaMax were seeking to develop the NeTV2, a digital video processing device that allows a user to record and modify video data from various sources, including streaming services and video games. The extant version of the device does not allow for the modification of encrypted video streams, but Huang and AlphaMax intended to add this as a feature by reverse engineering Intel's High-Bandwidth Digital Content Protection copy protection system. Their concern, however, was that this would qualify as a breach of Section 1201 of the DMCA. In this capacity, the EFF's lawsuit is a preliminary injunction against that portion of the DMCA.

Discussing his motivations behind the suit, Huang said, "When I was a graduate student, I saw a generation of younger engineers growing up stunted and fearful under [the DMCA's] shadow ... In multiple startups since, I saw numerous, legitimate business opportunities stymied by the statute."

In July 2019, a federal judge ruled that the lawsuit could proceed. In 2021, District of Columbia Court Judge Emmet G. Sullivan denied the preliminary injunction put forth by the EFF, citing that the Department of Justice, who were brought forth to defend against the case in 2016, had sufficiently demonstrated that the DMCA is a necessary amendment to existing copyright law, and that to this end it does not place undue or unwarranted restrictions on free speech. The specific assertion by the EFF and Huang that code qualifies as speech, and thus qualifies for the protections given to free speech, was not explicitly rejected in the decision, though Sullivan did remark that the Department of Justice "makes a compelling argument" against that assessment within the purview of the EFF's proposed injunction.

== Awards ==
In 2007, Huang received the Lewis Winner award for Best paper at ISSCC 2006 (A 10 Gbit/s photonic modulator and WDM MUX/DEMUX integrated with electronics in 0.13 um SOI CMOS, Solid-State Circuits Conference, 2006. ISSCC 2006. Digest of Technical Papers. IEEE International)

In September 2012, Huang received the 2012 EFF Pioneer Award for his work in hardware hacking, open source and activism.

== Bibliography ==
Publications

- Huang, Andrew (1999). An Implementation of Guarded Pointers with Tight Bounds on Segment Size (PDF). Massachusetts Institute of Technology.
- Huang, Andrew (May 26, 2002). "Keeping Secrets in Hardware: the Microsoft XBoxTM Case Study" (PDF). AI Memo 2002-008.
- Huang, Andrew (2002). ADAM: A Decentralized Parallel Computer Architecture Featuring Fast Thread and Data Migration and a Uniform Hardware Abstraction (PDF). Massachusetts Institute of Technology.
- Huang, Andrew; et al. (2006). A 10Gb/s photonic modulator and WDM MUX/DEMUX integrated with electronics in 0.13/spl mu/m SOI CMOS. pp. 922–929. doi:10.1109/ISSCC.2006.1696133. ISBN 978-1-4244-0079-9. ISSN 0193-6530. S2CID 30678835.
- Huang, Andrew (March 31, 2015). "The Death of Moore's Law Will Spur Innovation". IEEE Spectrum.
- Huang, Andrew (July 21, 2016). "Against the Law: Countering Lawful Abuses of Digital Surveillance". Pubpub. The Journal of Open Engineering. doi:10.21428/12268.

Books

- Huang, Andrew (2003). Hacking the Xbox: An Introduction to Reverse Engineering. No Starch Press. ISBN 978-1593270292.
- Huang, Andrew (2016). The Essential Guide to Electronics in Shenzhen (PDF). Sutajio Ko-Usagi. ISBN 978-9810974596.
- Huang, Andrew (2017). The Hardware Hacker: Adventures in Making and Breaking Hardware. No Starch Press. ISBN 978-1593277581.
