= BusKill =

Computer kill cord

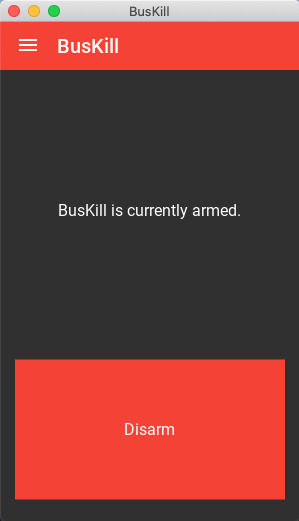
- Original author: Michael Altfield
- Developer: BusKill Development Team
- Release: August 2, 2020; 6 years ago
- Stable release: v0.7.0 / June 17, 2023; 3 years ago
- Written in: Python
- Operating system: Linux, macOS, Windows, Qubes OS
- Type: Anti-forensic
- License: CC BY-SA, GPLv3
- Website: buskill.in; buskillvampfih2iucxhit3qp36i2zzql3u6pmkeafvlxs3tlmot5yad.onion ^{(Accessing link help)}

BusKill is a project that makes a physical cord intended to lock a computer when the user walks away.

It is an open-source hardware and software project that designs computer kill cords to protect the confidentiality of the system's data from physical theft. The hardware designs are licensed CC BY-SA and the software is licensed GPLv3. BusKill cables are available commercially from the official website or through authorized distributors.

== History ==
The original BusKill prototype from 2017

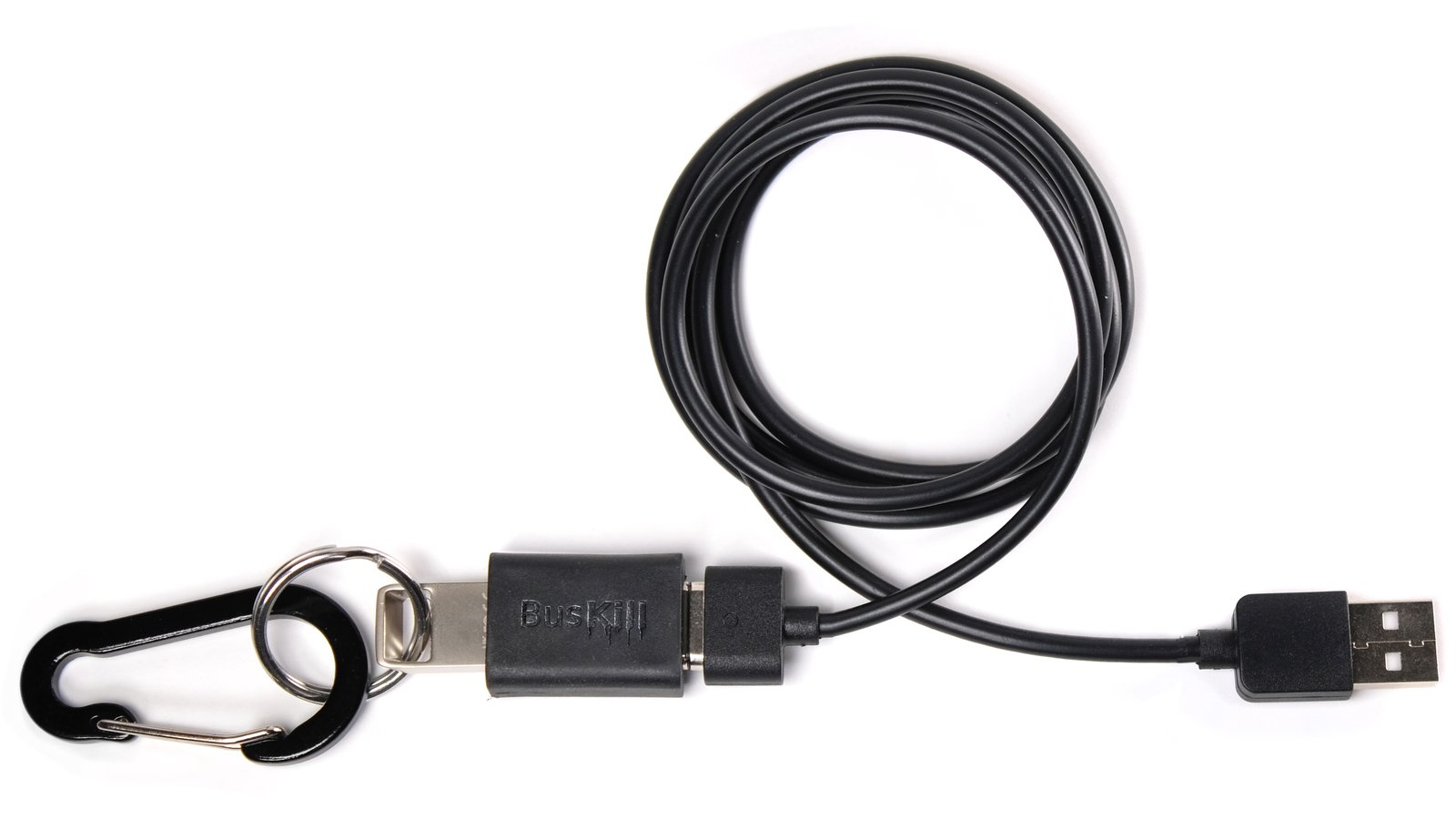
The BusKill Kit in 2022

The first computer kill cord was built by Michael Altfield in 2017.

The term "BusKill" was coined by Altfield in January 2020 when publishing the first BusKill build and udev usage instructions (Linux-only), and it was ported by cyberkryption from Linux to Windows a couple weeks later. The name BusKill is an amalgamation of "Bus" from USB and "Kill" from kill cord.

The project's official website launched the following month in February 2020.

The first macOS version of the BusKill app was released in May 2020 by Steven Johnson.

A cross-platform rewrite of the software based on Kivy was released in August 2020 with support for Linux, macOS, and Windows.

In December 2021, Alt Shift International OÜ ran a crowdfunding campaign to manufacture BusKill cables on Crowd Supply. The campaign raised $18,507 by January 2022.

== Hardware ==
The BusKill cable is a kill cord that physically tethers a user to their computer with a USB cable.

One end of the cable plugs into a computer. The other end of the cable is a carabiner that attaches to the user.

In the middle of the cable is a magnetic breakaway coupler, to allow the cable to be safely separated at any angle without physically damaging the computer or the user.

A 3D-printable hardware BusKill cable is currently under development.

== Software ==
The BusKill project maintains a cross-platform GUI app that can either lock the screen or shutdown the computer when the cable's connection to the computer is severed and the app is in the "armed" state.

== Use ==
If the computer is separated from the user, then a magnetic breakaway in the cable causes a USB hotplug removal event to execute a trigger in the app.

The trigger executed by the BusKill cable's removal can lock the screen, shutdown, or securely erase the LUKS header and master encryption keys within a few seconds of the cable's separation.

If combined with full disk encryption, then these triggers can be used to ensure the confidentiality of data or be used as a counter-forensics device.

== See also ==
- Dead man's switch
- USBKill
- Tails (operating system)
- List of data-erasing software
- List of free and open-source software packages
