= Lou Doctor =

- Occupation: Entrepreneur
- Notable work: Crowd Supply

Louis J. Doctor is an e-commerce entrepreneur, and the founder and CEO of Crowd Supply and Velotech. He utilises an approach that has been called "reverse e-commerce".

Doctor is also a managing director at Horizon Partners.
