= Variety Jones and Smedley =

Pseudonyms of people involved in Silk Road

Variety Jones (or Cimon) and Smedley Charger (or Smed) are pseudonyms of individuals reported to have been closely involved with the founding of the darknet market Silk Road.

== Involvement ==
According to security researcher Runa A. Sandvik, Variety Jones joined Silk Road in 2011 as a marijuana seed vendor, opposed to the war on drugs. Working closely with Ross Ulbricht, they were to act as a penetration tester, financial advisor and mentor, and was the person who suggested the "Dread Pirate Roberts" title Ulbricht used. According to seized chat logs, Jones was also the one to suggest the first alleged murder for hire, though it did not actually take place.

Smedley joined the site as a coder following the Gawker user influx as a relatively highly paid employee. Unfinished projects included encrypted email system "Silk Mail" and other prospective financial and internet projects. At times it appeared Smedley reported directly to Jones.

== Identities ==
Research into these individuals' identities has been conducted via tracking blockchain Bitcoin transactions, confidential sources, rare Thai marijuana seeds and rationalisation of aliases. Consequently, it has been suggested Smedley's true identity could be Mike Wattier, an American web developer living in Thailand. Variety Jones is believed to be Roger Thomas Clark, a Canadian living in Thailand. On December 3, 2015, Clark was arrested in Thailand and faced extradition to the United States. In 2023, Clark was sentenced to 20 years in prison.

== Arrest and extradition ==
Nearly a year after his arrest and detainment in Thailand, Clark claimed he had "top secret information" for intelligence officials close to Prayut Chan-o-cha, prime minister of Thailand's military government.

While fighting extradition in Thailand, where he slept on a concrete floor, Clark maintained that he had knowledge of a corrupt FBI agent involved with Silk Road.

Clark was extradited to the United States on June 15, 2018. He was charged with narcotics trafficking conspiracy; narcotics trafficking; distributing narcotics by means of the internet; conspiracy to commit, and aid and abet, a computer hacking conspiracy; conspiracy to traffic in fraudulent identification documents; and money laundering conspiracy. In January 2020, Clark pleaded guilty to conspiring to distribute narcotics. On July 11 2023, he was sentenced for 20 years.
