= Absolute OpenBSD =

Absolute OpenBSD: Unix for the Practical Paranoid
- Author: Michael W. Lucas
- Cover artist: Octopod Studios
- Publisher: No Starch Press
- Publication date: June 2003 (1st ed.); April 2013 (2nd ed.)
- Media type: Print (Paperback)
- Pages: 528
- ISBN: 1-886411-99-9
- OCLC: 51478244
- Dewey Decimal: 005.4/32 21
- LC Class: QA76.76.O63 L835

Absolute OpenBSD: Unix for the Practical Paranoid is a comprehensive guide to the OpenBSD operating system by Michael W. Lucas, author of Absolute FreeBSD and Cisco Routers for the Desperate. The book assumes basic knowledge of the design, commands, and user permissions of Unix-like operating systems. The book contains troubleshooting tips, background information on the system and its commands, and examples to assist with learning.

== 1st edition ==
The first edition was released in June 2003. Some of the information in the book became outdated when OpenBSD 3.4 was released only a few months later.

== 2nd edition ==
The second edition was released in April 2013. Peter N. M. Hansteen, author of The Book of PF, was the technical reviewer.
