= Green v. Department of Justice =

Lawsuit at the United States District Court for the District of Columbia Court

- Court: United States District Court for the District of Columbia
- Full case name: Matthew Green, Andrew Huang, and Alphamax, LLC v. U.S. Department Of Justice, William Barr, Library Of Congress, Carla Hayden, U.S. Copyright Office, and Karyn A. Temple

Green v. Department of Justice was a lawsuit at the United States District Court for the District of Columbia filed to test the constitutionality of the anti-circumvention provisions enacted in the 1998 Digital Millennium Copyright Act (DMCA). The lawsuit argues that, as passed, the anti-circumvention provisions of the DMCA prevent legitimate speech under the First Amendment to the United States Constitution.

== Background ==
The Digital Millennium Copyright Act (DMCA) was passed in 1998 primarily to ratify two copyright treaties set forth by the World Intellectual Property Organization in 1996 to adapt copyrights for new digital technology. To satisfy requests from numerous different interest groups, Congress recognized that they would have to extend copyright protections to include provisions making it illegal to make or distribute software and hardware that could circumvent digital copyright protections placed on works by their publishers, such as decryption of encrypted works. To balance free speech allowances under the First Amendment to the United States Constitution and fair use, the DMCA instructs the Library of Congress to issue narrow exemptions to the anti-circumvention provisions every three years based on public input and review. Since its passage, the DMCA has been criticized as having chilling effects on free speech, though prior case law in lower courts had not found any cause to deem the law unconstitutional.

The current lawsuit was filed pro bono in 2016 by the Electronic Frontier Foundation (EFF) and Wilson Sonsini Goodrich & Rosati representing security researchers Matthew D. Green and Andrew Huang. Green, a professor at Johns Hopkins University, wanted to publish details of security lapses in commercial devices but feared that the manufacturers would take legal action against him under the DMCA, while Huang wanted to develop technology to incorporate additional feeds into high-definition television streams, but this required decrypting the High-bandwidth Digital Content Protection (HDCP) required for most HDTV content. The lawsuit contends that the central provision of the DMCA, Section 1201, is overly broad and unconstitutional since it restrict these lawful uses of technology under the First Amendment, and that the three-year exemption-making process was slow and burdensome enough to also be unconstitutional. The lawsuit sought a preliminary injunction against the United States Department of Justice from enforcing Section 1201, and against the Library of Congress and the United States Copyright Office from enforcing the three-year rulemaking process.

The case stalled until June 2019 when Judge Emmet G. Sullivan issued an order in response to the government's request for summary judgement to dismiss the case. In the order, Judge Sullivan dismissed the lawsuit's claims about the overly broad nature of the DMCA or the three-year rulemaking process, determining these were not burdensome, but did agree that the DMCA did interfere with the specific type of work that Green and Huang intended to do, both as valid First Amendment activities. Because Green and Huang had a good chance to succeed in demonstrating harm to their speech, Judge Sullivan allowed the case to continue on these specific claims. However, Sullivan declined to hear the case in 2021; EFF sought to appeal the case to United States Court of Appeals for the District of Columbia Circuit.

== Decision ==
The United States District Court for the District of Columbia found that the plaintiffs failed to show that the DMCA's impact on third-party free speech interests was different from its impact on their own. The court also held that the triennial rulemaking process for exemptions did not constitute content-based censorship. The plaintiffs' as-applied claims were later dismissed after the Librarian of Congress granted an exemption for the professor's security research, and the court found that the tech inventor's proposed device would likely lead to widespread piracy.

The United States Court of Appeals for the District of Columbia Circuit affirmed the district court's dismissal of the facial challenges. The court held that the DMCA's anticircumvention and antitrafficking provisions are not facially overbroad because they regulate conduct, not speech, and their legitimate applications, such as preventing digital piracy, far outweigh any potential unconstitutional applications. The court also rejected the argument that the triennial rulemaking process constitutes a prior restraint on speech, noting that the DMCA does not target expression and that alternative avenues for lawful access to copyrighted works remain available.
