= MoMA Eve =

Handheld gaming console

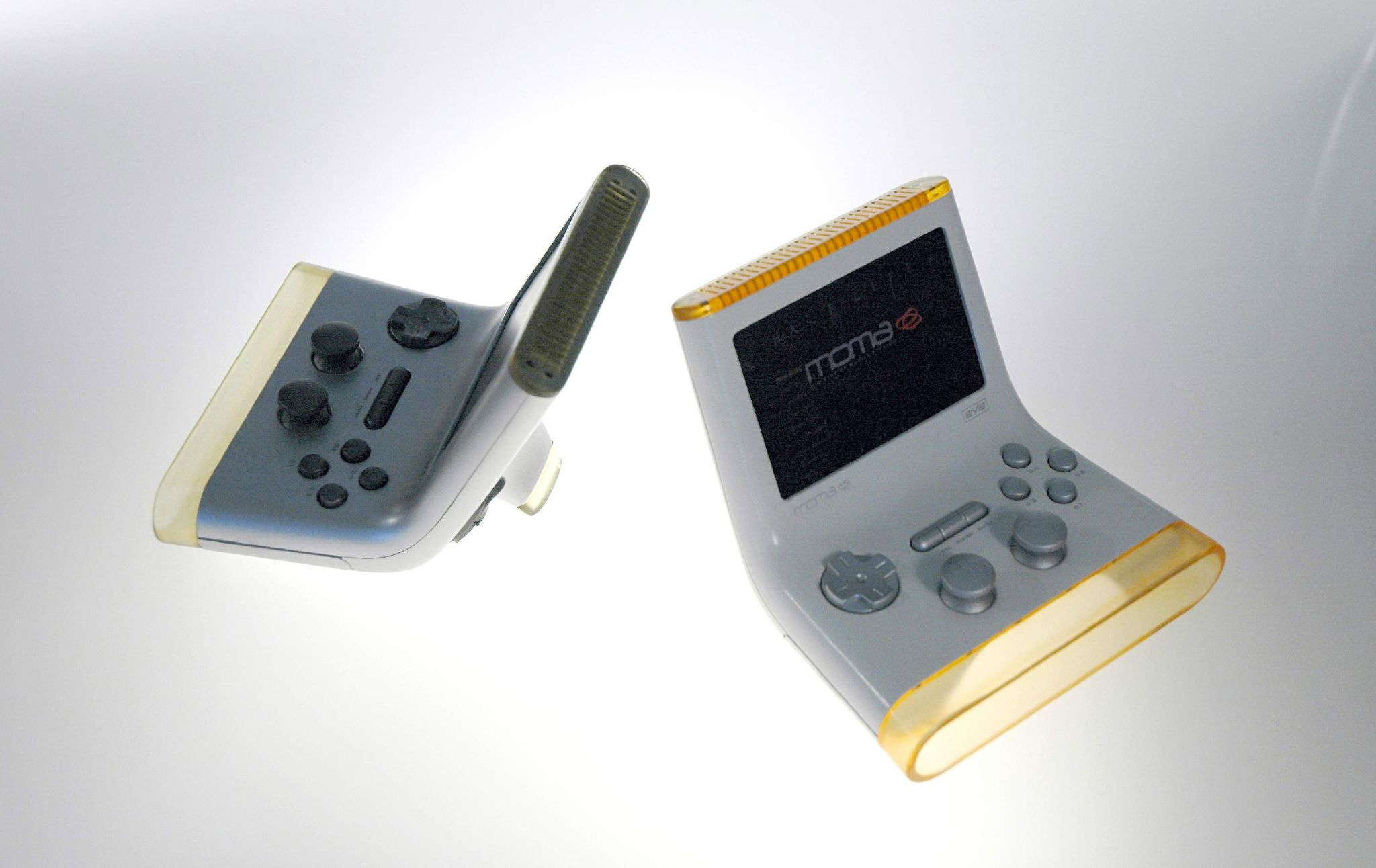
- Two MoMA Eve consoles.
- Developer: Ministry of Mobile Affairs (MoMA), Meyerhoffer Studios
- Manufacturer: VIA
- Type: Handheld game console
- Generation: Seventh generation of video game consoles
- Introductory price: Below US$500
- Operating system: Windows XP embedded
- CPU: 533-MHz Eden-N
- Memory: 128MB DDR266 SDRAM
- Storage: 20GB
- Removable storage: Compact Flash Type II
- Display: 4" 640x480 TFT LCD
- Graphics: 200-MHz S3 Graphics UniChrome Pro IGP
- Sound: Via Vinyl
- Connectivity: Wi-Fi 802.11b
- Online services: GameDweller Network by AceGain

The MoMA Eve was a handheld gaming console presented by Via at E3 2004. It was supposed to play PC games as well as games designed for it. The player would have had to purchase a SIM Card to play purchased games on it. The buttons look like the buttons on an average video game controller with a D-pad on the left, four action buttons on the right, one Start button in the middle, and two analog sticks. It had a 533 MHz processor, a 20 GB hard drive for games and movies, Wi-Fi, and a CF slot. It also had TV-OUT. The console encountered a trademark issue in mid-2004. The system was never released and is considered vaporware.

== Hardware ==
The system used a 533-MHz Eden-N CPU, with an FSB operating at 133-MHz. This operated in conjunction with a 200-MHz S3 Graphics UniChrome Pro Integrated Graphics Processor and 128 MB of DDR266 SDRAM. A 1.8" 20 GB Hard drive capable of 133 MB/s was used for storage.

The system used VIA Vinyl Audio, supporting six channels. The system had a 1/8" jack for Headphones and one 1/8 jack for Microphone. The system also had a 1/8" TV out jack. The system included 2 USB 2.0 Type A ports The system was powered by two prismatic lithium-ion batteries with two slots in the console, and were hot swappable.
