= Fleming's rules =

Fleming's rules are a pair of visual mnemonics for determining the relative directions of magnetic field, electric current, and velocity of a conductor.

There are two rules, one is Fleming's left-hand rule for motors which applies to situations where an electric current induces motion in the conductor in the presence of magnetic fields (Lorentz force). For example, in electric motors. The purpose of the rule is to find the direction of motion in an electric motor.

The second is Fleming's right-hand rule for generators, which applies to situations where a conductor moving through a magnetic field has an electromotive force induced in it as a result (Faraday's law of induction). The purpose of the rule is to find the direction of induced current when a conductor moves in a magnetic field.
