= Novena (computing platform) =

Open-source computing hardware project

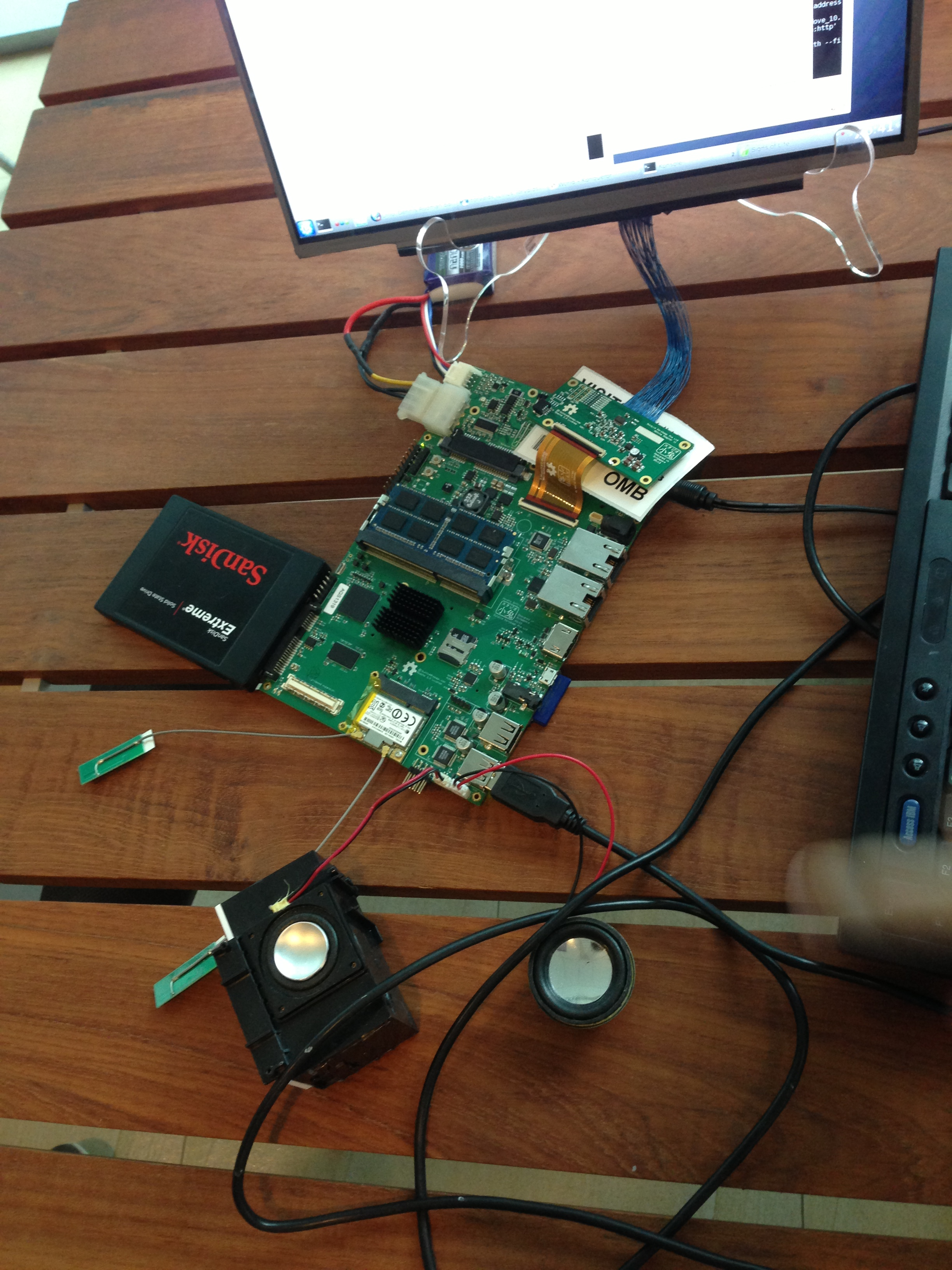
- Novena system in operation
- Date invented: 2014
- Design firm: Bunnie Studios
- Manufacturer: Kosagi
- Introduced: 2014
- Discontinued: 2019
- Processor: ARM Cortex-A9 (Freescale i.MX6 quad-core)
- Frequency: 1.2 GHz (quad-core)
- Memory: 4 GiB DDR3
- Ports: 1 Gbit/s Ethernet; 100 Mbit/s Ethernet; 2 × USB 2.0, supporting 1.5 A; USB OTG; HDMI; 3.5 mm audio jack; SD card reader

Novena is an open-source computing hardware project designed by Andrew "bunnie" Huang and Sean "Xobs" Cross. The initial design of Novena started in 2012. It was developed by Sutajio Ko-usagi Pte. Ltd. and funded by a crowdfunding campaign which began on April 15, 2014. The first offering was a 1.2 GHz Freescale Semiconductor i.MX6 quad-core ARM architecture computer closely coupled with a Xilinx FPGA. It was offered in "desktop", "laptop", or "heirloom laptop" form, or as a standalone motherboard. The Novena platform entered end-of-life status in 2019.

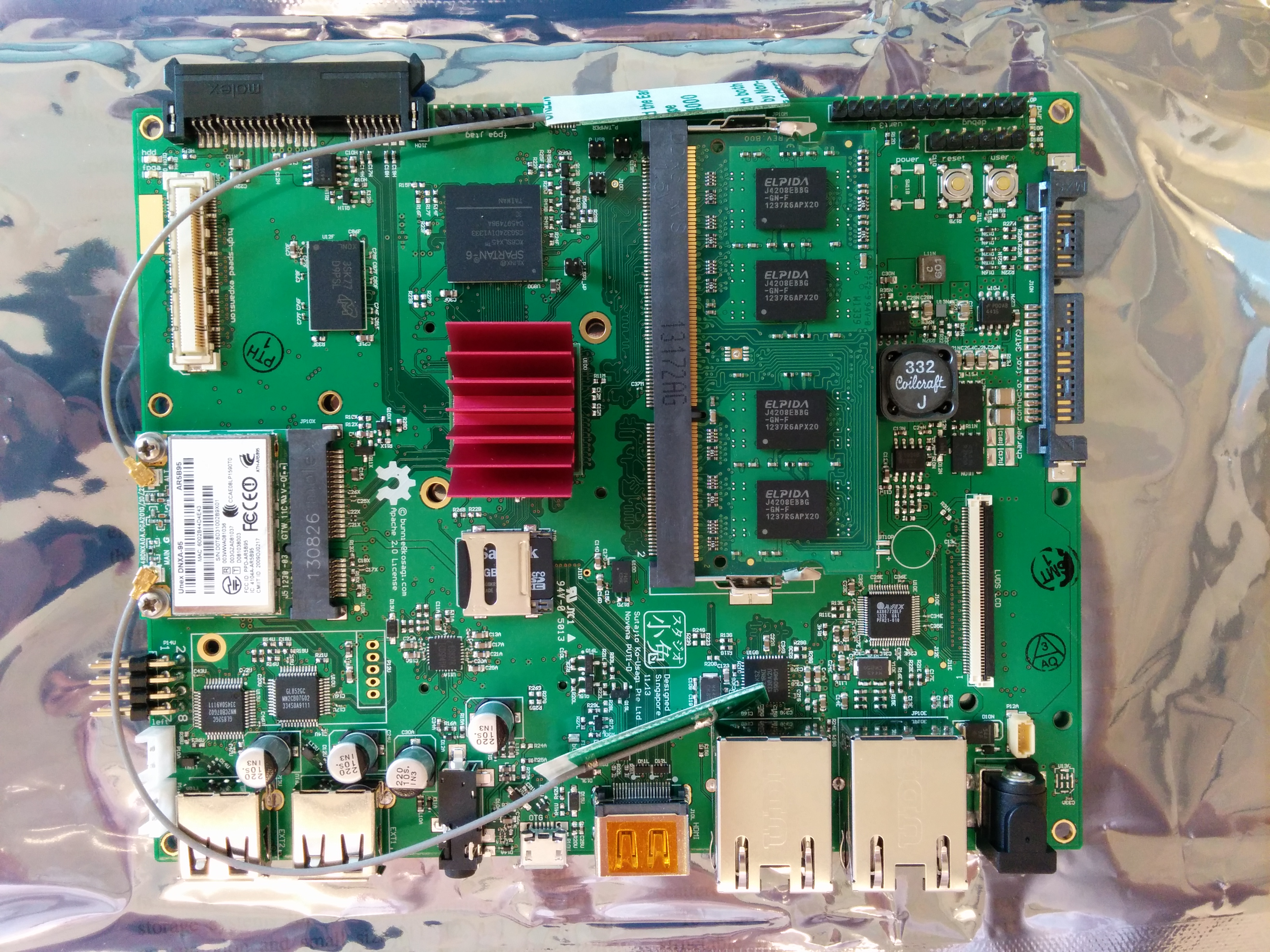
Novena laptop motherboard

On May 19, 2014, the crowdfunding campaign concluded having raised just over 280% of its target. The extra funding allowed the project to achieve the following four "stretch goals", with the three hardware stretch goals being shipped in the form of add-on boards that use the Novena's special high-speed I/O expansion header, as seen in the upper-left of the Novena board:

- Development of free and open source graphics drivers for the on-board video accelerator (etnaviv)
- Inclusion of a general-purpose breakout board providing 16 FPGA outputs and eight FPGA inputs (3.3 or 5 V gang-selectable via software), six 10-bit analog inputs (up to 200 ksps sample rate) and two 10-bit analog outputs (~100 ksps max rate)
- Inclusion of a "ROMulator" breakout board capable of emulating TSOP NAND flash devices
- Inclusion of a MyriadRF software-defined radio at all hardware-purchasing backing levels.

The Novena shipped with a screwdriver, as users are required to install the battery themselves, screw on the LCD bezel of their choice, and obtain speakers as a kit instead of using speaker boxes. Owners of a 3D printer can make and fine tune their own speaker box. The mainboards were manufactured by AQS, an electronics manufacturing services provider.

The initial crowdfunding campaign promised guaranteed availability of the Novena mainboard for 5 years, with new hardware produced based on demand. This continued until an August 2019 announcement that the mainboard would be entering end-of-life status, with remaining stock being discounted.

== See also ==
- Open-source hardware
- Modular smartphone
