= Leander Kahney =

British technology writer and author

Leander Kahney (born 25 November 1965) is a technology writer and author. He is a former managing editor, and previously a senior reporter, at Wired News, the online sister publication of Wired.

== Career ==
He is also the author of five books centered on the subculture surrounding Apple products, as well as the company itself: The Cult of Mac, Cult of iPod (ISBN 1-886411-83-2), Inside Steve's Brain, Jony Ive – The Genius Behind Apple’s Greatest Products, and Tim Cook – The Genius Who Took Apple to the Next Level.

Kahney is currently best known for his role as editor and publisher of a popular Apple-centric blog, also titled Cult of Mac. As a prominent writer on Apple- and Mac-related topics, Kahney was once theorized (incorrectly) to be the identity of Fake Steve Jobs.

Leander has worked for many other publications, including: MacWeek as a senior reporter, Scientific American, The Observer and The Guardian in London. Working as a newspaper reporter in the UK, he covered amongst other things, the war in former Yugoslavia.
