= No Starch Press =

American publishing company

- Founded: 1994
- Founder: Bill Pollock
- Country of origin: United States
- Headquarters location: San Francisco, California
- Distribution: Penguin Random House Publisher Services
- Publication types: Books
- Nonfiction topics: Technical
- Official website: www.nostarch.com

No Starch Press is an American publishing company, specializing in technical literature often geared towards the geek, hacker, and DIY subcultures. Popular titles include Hacking: The Art of Exploitation, Andrew Huang's Hacking the Xbox, and How Wikipedia Works.

== Topics ==
No Starch Press publishes books with a focus on networking, computer security, hacking, Linux, programming, technology for kids, Lego, math, and science. The publisher also releases educational comics like Super Scratch Programming Adventure and The Manga Guide to Science series.

== History ==
No Starch Press was founded in 1994 by Bill Pollock. It is headquartered in San Francisco.

== Availability ==
No Starch Press titles are available online and in bookstores in all major English language markets worldwide. No Starch Press titles have been translated into over thirty languages.

Penguin Random House Publisher Services distributes No Starch Press titles in the U.S. and worldwide.

== Popular books ==
- Absolute OpenBSD
- The Cult of Mac
- Debian System
- Hacking: The Art of Exploitation
- How Wikipedia Works
- Programming Linux Games
- English-language editions of several of The Manga Guides books:
  - The Manga Guide to Biochemistry
  - The Manga Guide to Calculus
  - The Manga Guide to Cryptography
  - The Manga Guide to Databases
  - The Manga Guide to Electricity
  - The Manga Guide to Linear Algebra
  - The Manga Guide to Molecular Biology
  - The Manga Guide to Physics
  - The Manga Guide to Regression Analysis
  - The Manga Guide to Relativity
  - The Manga Guide to Statistics
  - The Manga Guide to the Universe
- The Linux Programming Interface: A Linux and UNIX System Programming Handbook
