= J3 Productions =

- Company type: Private
- Genre: R
- Founded: 1998
- Founder: Jonathan Lo
- Headquarters: Irvine, California, USA
- Website: www.j3productions.com

J3 Productions is a multidisciplinary design studio located in Irvine, California. It was founded in 1998 by principal and creative director Jonathan Lo. The studio offers lifestyle, fashion, decor, and retail services.
