= Jonathan Lo =

American artist

- Education: Art Center College of Design
- Known for: Founder of J3 Productions

Jonathan Lo is the principal and founder of J3 Productions, an award winning multidisciplinary design studio and consultancy. He has acted as the former creative director for Pop Life magazine, contributed as a regional editor for ApartmentTherapy.com, and has been featured as an on-air expert on HGTV’s “Small Space Big Style.” Jonathan is also creator and editor of the popular design and lifestyle blog, happymundane.com. Jonathan has been a featured artist for his photography on Instagram, Apple, Urban Outfitters, and numerous publications.
