= Archdeacons in the Diocese in Europe =

Senior clergy of the Church of England Diocese in Europe

The archdeacons in the Diocese in Europe are senior clergy of the Church of England Diocese in Europe. They each have responsibility over their own archdeaconry, of which there are currently seven, each of which is composed of one or more deaneries, which are composed in turn of chaplaincies (as opposed to the parishes of the mainland and Manx dioceses).

They share this task with running a local church in their area, although the Diocese in Europe was (as of 2012) working towards a new system whereby there would be four full-time archdeacons instead. Colin Williams became a full-time Archdeacon for both the Eastern archdeaconry and that of Germany and Northern Europe ("Archdeacon of Europe") in September 2015, based in Frankfurt, Germany; his successor, Leslie Nathaniel is full-time in both roles together. David Waller is now also archdeacon of two archdeaconries: Gibraltar and Italy & Malta. It is also intended that the next Archdeacon of France (full-time) will also, eventually, become Archdeacon of Switzerland.

In 1866, the Diocese of Gibraltar had two archdeaconries: Gibraltar and Malta. The current roles of archdeacons are set down in the diocese's 1995 constitution.

== Archdeacons of Gibraltar ==
The archdeaconry covers the Western Mediterranean, including Andorra, Spain, Portugal, Morocco, Madeira and the Balearic and Canary Islands. The area deaneries include Algarve (Portugal), Puerto de la Cruz (Tenerife) and Palma de Mallorca. In 2013, the archdeaconry synod voted to change its name to "Iberia and Gibraltar", but this change has not been effected. The Cathedral Church is that of the Holy Trinity in Gibraltar.

The archdeacon is David Waller, also of Italy and Malta.

- 1842–1861 (d.): Edward Burrow
- 1861–1864: vacant.
- 1864–?: Thomas Sleeman
- ...
- 1881–30 August 1912 (d.): Decimus Govett, chaplain then Dean of Gibraltar
- 1912–1916: ?
- 1916–1929 (res.): Gilbert Sissons, chaplain of Rome and of the Embassy (until 1920), of Venice (1920–1921) and of Alassio (1921–1924; later archdeacon emeritus)
- 1929–26 December 1933 (d.): Thomas Buckton, sometime chaplain of Nice
- 1934–31 July 1945 (d.): Lonsdale Ragg
- 1945–1950: ?
- 1950–1963 (ret.): James Johnston, who had been Precentor of the Cathedral 1934-45
- 1963–1987 (ret.): Basil Ney, chaplain of Madrid
- 1987–1993 (res.): Daniel Pina Cabral, assistant bishop
- 1994–2002 (res.): Ken Robinson, chaplain of Lisbon with Estoril (until 2000) and Dean of Gibraltar (from 2000)
- 2002–2005 (res.): Howell Sasser, chaplain of Porto
- 2005–2008 (ret.): Alan Woods, Dean of Gibraltar
- 2008–2013 (ret.): David Sutch, chaplain of Costa del Sol East
- 2013–2014 (Acting): Geoff Johnston, chaplain of Nerja and Almuñécar, Spain (until 2014)
- 17 October 2014 – 6 December 2019 (ret.): Geoff Johnston
- 14 January 2020 – present: David Waller, also Archdeacon of Italy & Malta

== Archdeacons of Malta, of Malta and of Italy and Malta ==
The archdeaconry covers the Central Mediterranean including Italy, Sicily and Malta. There is a Pro-Cathedral of St Paul in Valletta, Malta.

The archdeacon in David Waller, also of Gibraltar.

Until 1978, the title was Archdeacon in/of Malta:

- ?–1849 (d.): Sir Cecil Bisshopp, chaplain to the Bishop of Gibraltar
- ?–1864 (d.): Thomas Le Mesurier, a chaplain to the forces

Records indicate that, from 1865 until 1925, the chaplain in Valletta was also archdeacon of Malta:

- 1865–25 March 1881 (d.): John Cleugh, chaplain of St Paul's Valletta
- Henry White was chaplain of Valletta<
- In 1892, Ambrose Hardy, the chaplain of St Paul's Collegiate Church, Valletta was also the Archdeacon of Malta.
- 1897–1900 (res.): Arthur Cartwright, chaplain of Valletta
- 1902–1903 (res.): Franklyn Lushington, chaplain of Valletta
- 1903–1905 (res.): Daniel Collyer, chaplain of Valletta
- Charles Gull, William Evered, Arthur Newton, Frederick Brock, Archibald Fargus and Arthur Moreton followed Collyer as chaplains at Valletta but aren't recorded as having been archdeacons.

In 1925, a third archdeaconry was created and the relationship between the two roles seems to have ended:

- 1925–3 February 1935 (d.): Ernest Philpott, the bishop's chaplain and commissary in London
- 2 May 1948 – 1964 (ret.): Frederick Bailey, chaplain of Florence (afterwards archdeacon emeritus)
- 1964–1971 (ret.): Douglas Wanstall, chaplain of All Saints' Rome (afterwards archdeacon emeritus)
- 1971–1975 (ret.): George Church, chaplain of Florence
- 1975–1978: John Evans, chaplain of Florence, became Archdeacon in Italy

Evans is recorded as Archdeacon in Italy after he was Archdeacon of Malta; the former may have been simply a renaming of the latter, especially since he retained his chaplaincy.

- 1978–1985 (ret.): John Evans, chaplain of Florence with Siena (until 1981), Chancellor of St Paul's Pro-Cathedral, Valletta (from 1981)
- 1985–1992 (ret.): George Westwell, chaplain of Florence with Siena
- 1992–1997 (res.): Eric Devenport, chaplain of Florence with Siena and honorary assistant bishop

Devenport is referred to retrospectively as Archdeacon of Italy and Malta, but his successors have all used that form:

- 1998–2000 (res.): Bill Edebohls, chaplain of Milan
- 2000–2003 (res.): Gordon Reid, chaplain of Milan with Lake Como and Genoa
- 2003–2005: vacancy?
- 2005–2009 (ret.): Arthur Siddall, chaplain of Naples with Sorrento, Capri and Bari (until 2007), Archdeacon of Switzerland and chaplain of Montreux with Anzere, Gstaad and Monthey (from 2007)
- 2009 – January 2016 (res.): Jonathan Boardman, chaplain of Rome
- 27 January 2016 – February 2019 (ret.): Vickie Sims, chaplain of Milan
- February 2019 – 6 November 2019 (ret.): Geoff Johnston, Archdeacon of Gibraltar, Acting Archdeacon of Italy and Malta
- 14 January 2020 – present: David Waller, also Archdeacon of Gibraltar

== Archdeacons of the Aegean and of the Eastern Archdeaconry ==
The Eastern Archdeaconry covers Eastern Europe – the Greater Athens deanery (Albania, Bosnia and Herzegovina, Bulgaria, Greece, the Republic of Macedonia, Montenegro, Romania, Serbia and Turkey), the Moscow deanery (Armenia, Azerbaijan, Belarus, Georgia, Kosovo, Moldova, Mongolia, Poland, Russia, Turkmenistan, Ukraine, and Uzbekistan, based at St Andrew's, Moscow) and the area for which the archdeacon takes direct responsibility (Austria, Croatia, Czech Republic, Hungary, Slovakia and Slovenia). The title was Archdeacon of the Aegean until 1994.

Before 1994, the archdeaconry was called the Aegean.

- 1935–1947 (ret.): John Sharp, Archdeacon in South-Eastern Europe and a canon of St Paul's Cathedral, Valletta.
- 1971–1977 (ret.): Stephen Skemp, chaplain of Ankara then Athens
- 1978–1994 (res.): Geoffrey Evans, "Archdeacon of the Aegean and the Danube" chaplain of Ïzmir with Bornova

After Evans' resignation, the archdeaconry was renamed the Eastern Archdeaconry.

- 1995–2000 (ret.): Jeremy Peake, chaplain of Vienna (from 1998)
- 2002–2015: Patrick Curran, chaplain of Vienna with Prague
- October 2015 – 1 April 2019 (ret.): Colin Williams (as Archdeacon of the Eastern archdeaconry and of Germany and Northern Europe)
- 1 April – 17 October 2019: Adèle Kelham, Archdeacon of Switzerland and Acting Archdeacon of the East
- 17 October 2019 – present: Leslie Nathaniel (also Archdeacon of Germany and Northern Europe)

== Archdeacons of the Riviera ==
The Archdeaconry of the Riviera was subsumed into the Archdeaconry of France c. 1995. Archdeacons described as Archdeacon of the Riviera included:

- 1972–1976 (res.): Henry Hearsey, chaplain of Nice
- 1976–1982 (ret.): Brian Matthews, chaplain of Monte Carlo with Beaulieu
- 1982– 1983 (res.): Ronald Jennison, chaplain of Nice with Vence
- 1984–1993 (ret.): John Livingstone, chaplain of Nice with Vence

== Archdeacons of North-West Europe ==
The area deaneries comprise Belgium & Luxembourg (based at St. Boniface Church, Antwerp) and The Netherlands (based at Christ Church, Amsterdam). There is a Pro-Cathedral of the Holy Trinity, Brussels. Before the expansion of the diocese in 1980 and erection of Holy Trinity into a Pro-Cathedral, this archdeaconry was called Belgium, Luxembourg and the Netherlands; it had its origin in 1977, and was the first archdeaconry of the diocese.

- 1977–1980: Peter Duplock, Archdeacon of Belgium, Luxembourg and the Netherlands and chaplain of Brussels
- 1980–1981 (ret.): Peter Duplock, Archdeacon of North-West Europe and chaplain of Brussels then Chancellor of Holy Trinity Pro-Cathedral, Brussels
- 1982–1993 (ret.): John Lewis, Chancellor and Senior Chaplain of Holy Trinity Pro-Cathedral, Brussels
- 1993–2004 (ret.): Geoffrey Allen, chaplain of East Netherlands (Arnhem, Nijmegen and Twenthe)
- 2005–2007 (ret.): Dirk van Leeuwen, vicar-general (from 2002), chaplain of Antwerp (1994–2006) and of Ostend, Knokke & Bruges (from 2001)
- 2008–2012 (ret.): John de Wit, chaplain of Utrecht with Amersfoort, Harderwijk and Zwolle
- 2012–2016 (Acting): Meurig Williams, bishop's domestic chaplain
- 2016–2020: Paul Vrolijk, Senior Chaplain and Chancellor of Brussels Cathedral from 2015.
- 12 June 2021 – present: Sam Van Leer, Chaplain of Groningen (Acting since 2020)

== Archdeacons of Northern France, of France and of France and Monaco ==
The Archdeaconry of France consists of all of France and Monaco and includes the Maisons-Lafitte deanery. As archdeacon, Meurig Williams, was based in Brussels (where he was the bishop's chaplain.) The two area deaneries are those of Lille (based at Christ Church, Lille) and Mid-Pyrenees & Aude. Before the mid-to-late 1990s, the post was called Archdeacon of Northern France.

- 1979–1980 (ret.): Eric McLellan, Archdeacon in France, chaplain at the British Embassy Church, Paris (from 1970)
- 1979–1984 (res.): John Livingstone, chaplain of St George's, Paris
- 1984–1985 (res.): Peter Sertin, chaplain of St Michael's, Paris
- 1986–1994 (res.): Brian Lea, chaplain of St Michael's, Paris
- 1994–2002 (ret.): Martin Draper, chaplain of St George's, Paris

By 1997, Draper was known as Archdeacon of France; his successors have borne this form of the title.

- 2002–2006 (ret.): Anthony Wells, chaplain of St Michael's, Paris
- 2007–30 June 2012 (ret.): Ken Letts, chaplain of Holy Trinity, Nice with Vence
- 25 October 2013 – 30 September 2016 (ret.): Ian Naylor, chaplain of Pau (until October 2015; acting archdeacon 2012–2013)
- 29 September 2016 – 1 January 2021 (res.): Meurig Williams, bishop's domestic chaplain and Archdeacon of France and Monaco
- 21 November 2021 – present: Peter Hooper (acting since 15 February 2021; also Archdeacon of Switzerland since c. 2022)

== Archdeacons of Switzerland ==
The archdeacon, Peter Hooper, has Archdeacon of France since 2021. Some sources show that Quin and Hawker were referred to as "Archdeacon in Switzerland."

- 1979–1980 (ret.): Thomas Quin, chaplain of Zürich
- 1980–1986 (res.): Anthony Nind, chaplain of Zürich
- 1986–2004 (ret.) Peter Hawker, chaplain of Berne (until 1989) and chaplain of Zürich (etc.; from 1989)
- 2004–1 September 2006 (ret.): John Williams, chaplain of Montreux
- 2007–2009 (ret.): Arthur Siddall, Archdeacon of Italy and Malta and chaplain of Montreux with Anzère, Gstaad and Monthey
- 25 September 2009 – 13 July 2016 (ret.): Peter Potter, chaplain of Berne (Berne with Neuchâtel before 2013)
- 14 July 2014 – 2021/22: Adèle Kelham, "Acting" Archdeacon, Chaplain at Lausanne (until October 2016) Kelham took up the full archidiaconal role but was called "acting" archdeacon solely because she was older than the Church's mandatory retirement age. She resigned the archdeaconry near the end of 2021.
- c. 2022 – present: Peter Hooper, Archdeacon of France and Switzerland

== Archdeacons of Scandinavia and of Germany and Northern Europe ==
The two area deaneries are those of Germany (based at St George's, Berlin) and The Nordic and Baltic States, including Norway, Sweden, Iceland, Denmark, Finland, Estonia and Latvia (based in Goteborg, Sweden).

Following the resignation of Jonathan Lloyd, the Archdeacon of Switzerland, Peter Potter, became acting archdeacon of Germany and Northern Europe until the licensing in October of Colin Williams as the new full-time Archdeacon for Eastern and Northern Europe.

Prior to 2005, the archdeaconry was called Scandinavia.

- 1980–1989 (res.): Brian Horlock, chaplain of Oslo with Bergen, Trondheim and Stavanger
- 1990–1995 (ret.): Gerald Brown, chaplain of Oslo with Bergen, Trondheim, Stavanger etc. (until 1992) and of Stockholm with Gävle & Västerås (from 1992)
- 1996–2005 (ret.): David Ratcliff, Archdeacon of Scandinavia and Germany, chaplain of Frankfurt-am-Main (until 1998), and of Stockholm with Gävle & Västerås (from 1998)

Since 2005, the archdeaconry has been called Germany and Northern Europe.

- 2005–2008 (res.): Mark Oakley, chaplain of Copenhagen
- 2008–2010: vacancy?
- 20 January 2010–March 2014 (res.): Jonathan Lloyd, chaplain of Copenhagen with Aarhus
- March 2014 – 2015 (Acting): the Archdeacon of Switzerland, Acting Archdeacon of Germany and Northern Europe

- October 2015 – 1 April 2019 (ret.): Colin Williams (as Archdeacon of the Eastern archdeaconry and of Germany and Northern Europe)
- 1 April – 17 October 2019: John Newsome, Area Dean of Germany and Acting Archdeacon of Germany and Northern Europe
- 17 October 2019 – present: Leslie Nathaniel (also Archdeacon of the East)

== Other archdeacons ==
From 1922 until 1929, Thomas Buckton, sometime chaplain of Nice, was Archdeacon in Spain and North Africa or Archdeacon in the Peninsula and North Africa before he was Archdeacon of Gibraltar and while there was another Archdeacon of Gibraltar in post.

From 1931 until his death on 29 June 1943, Edward Eliot was Archdeacon in Italy and the French Riviera and a canon of Gibraltar.

From 1996 until 1998, Gordon Reid, vicar-general of the Diocese in Europe and (from 1997) priest-in-charge at St Michael, Cornhill was Archdeacon in Europe.
