= Colin Williams (priest) =

British Anglican priest (born 1952)

The Reverend Canon Colin Williams
- Archdeacon of Europe
- Diocese: Diocese in Europe
- In office: October 2015 – March 2019
- Other posts: Archdeacon of Lancaster (1999–2005); General Secretary, CEC (2005–2010)

Orders
- Ordination: 1981 (deacon); 1982 (priest) by David Sheppard

Personal details
- Born: 12 August 1952 (age 74)
- Denomination: Anglican
- Parents: William and Blanche Williams
- Spouse: Single
- Profession: Solicitor (former)
- Education: Pembroke College, Oxford

Colin Henry Williams (born 12 August 1952) is a British Anglican priest. Since 2015, he has served as an Archdeacon in the Diocese in Europe; he was Archdeacon of Lancaster from 1999 to 2005.

== Early life and education ==
Williams was born on 12 August 1952, the son of William Henry Williams and Blanche Williams. He was educated at King George V Grammar School for Boys, Southport, and Pembroke College, Oxford, whence he graduated Bachelor of Arts (BA) 1973 and proceeded Master of Arts (Oxford) (MA Oxon) 1977. He trained as a solicitor at the College of Law, Chester, qualified and practised as a solicitor in Wigan, 1974–1978.

== Ordained ministry ==
Williams trained for the ministry at St Stephen's House, Oxford, 1980–1981, gaining a second BA. He was made a deacon at Petertide 1981 (12 July) and ordained a priest the Petertide following (4 July 1982) – both times by David Sheppard, Bishop of Liverpool, at Liverpool Cathedral. After a curacy at St Paul's Stoneycroft, Liverpool, he was Team Vicar in Walton from 1984 to 1989. He served as domestic chaplain to the Bishop of Blackburn (Alan Chesters) – and Chaplain (lead clergy) of Whalley Abbey retreat and conference centre – from 1989 to 1994. Whilst Vicar of St Chad's Poulton-le-Fylde from 1994 to 1999, he was also elected a Proctor in Convocation, serving two quinquennia (1995–2005), and became a member of the Meissen Commission (1996–2005).

In 1999, he was collated Archdeacon of Lancaster (in the Diocese of Blackburn), which post he held (he was afterwards made "archdeacon emeritus") until his 2005 appointment as General Secretary of the ecumenical Conference of European Churches, based in Geneva. While Archdeacon, he was a member of the Council for Christian Unity, 2003–2005; he was later made an honorary canon of Cathedral of the Holy Trinity, Gibraltar, 2007–2010. He returned to parish ministry in 2010, becoming Team Rector of the Ludlow Team Ministry; during which time he was made an honorary canon and prebendary of Hereford Cathedral from 2014 onwards.

On 24 May 2015, it was announced that Williams would become Archdeacon of Europe – i.e. the first full-time Archdeacon in the Diocese in Europe from October 2015. Historically, archdeacons in Europe have had other parochial (chaplaincy) duties in addition to their work as archdeacons. He was in charge of both the Eastern archdeaconry and that of Germany and Northern Europe, and he was based in Frankfurt, Germany.

In 2018, it was announced that Williams is to retire effective 31 March 2019.

Church of England titles
Preceded by Robert Ladds	Archdeacon of Lancaster; 1999–2005	Succeeded by Peter Ballard
Preceded by Patrick Curran as Archdeacon of the Eastern Archdeaconry	Archdeacon of Europe; 2015–2019	Succeeded by Leslie Nathaniel as Archdeacon of the East, Germany and Northern Europe
Preceded by Jonathan Lloyd as Archdeacon of Germany and Northern Europe	Archdeacon of Europe; 2015–2019	Succeeded by Leslie Nathaniel as Archdeacon of the East, Germany and Northern Europe
