= Pat Curran =

Pat or Patrick Curran may refer to:

- Pat Curran (American football) (born 1945), tight end
- Pat Curran (Australian footballer) (born 1946), Australian rules footballer
- Pat Curran (fighter) (born 1987), American MMA fighter
- Pat Curran (footballer, born 1917) (1917–2003), English footballer
- Patrick Curran (politician), Irish politician
- Patrick J. Curran (born 1965), University of North Carolina psychology professor
- Pete Curran (1860–1910), British politician, born Patrick Curran
- Patrick Curran (priest) (born 1956), Archdeacon of the Eastern Archdeaconry
- Patrick Curran (hurler) (born 1996), Irish hurler
- Pat Curran (New Zealand politician) (1908–1985), New Zealand politician
