= John Evans (archdeacon of Malta) =

John Walter Evans (22 February 1919 – 24 November 1988) was Archdeacon of Malta from 1975 to 1978.

Evans was born in 1919 and studied at Durham University as a member of St Chad's College, completing his Bachelor of Arts degree in 1941. After theological studies at Ripon College Cuddesdon, he was ordained in 1942.

Following a curacy at Roath, he became Chaplain at Barnard Castle School and served as the Vicar of Hammersmith from 1965 to 1975.

In retirement, Evans lived in Huntington, Cheshire. He died there on 24 November 1988, at the age of 69.

== Notes ==
Church of England titles
Preceded by Frederick Bailey	Archdeacon of Malta; 1975–1978	Succeeded by George Church
