= Douglas Wanstall =

English Anglican priest (1899–1974)

Douglas James Noel Wanstall (22 November 1899 - 5 October 1974) was an English Anglican priest who was the Archdeacon of Malta in the Church of England Diocese in Europe from 1964 to 1971.

Wanstall was educated at Keble College, Oxford, and Ely Theological College. He was ordained in 1927 and, after a curacy at St Philip's Kensington, he became a chaplain in the Royal Navy. He was later the chaplain of All Saints' Church, Rome, before his appointment as an archdeacon.

Church of England titles
Preceded by Frederick James Bailey	Archdeacon of Malta; 1964 – 1971	Succeeded by George Harold Christian Church
