= David Waller (priest) =

British Anglican priest (born 1958)

David James Waller (born 9 November 1958) is a British Anglican priest who has been Archdeacon of Gibraltar and of Italy and Malta, in the Diocese in Europe since 14 January 2020.

Waller was educated at Whitelands College, Ripon College Cuddeson and ordained in 1988. He also attended Roehampton Institute (BA, 1985), King's College London (MA, 1995), Heythrop College, University of London (MTh, 2002) and Sarum College (MA, 2016). After a curacy at Tettenhall Regis he was Chaplain at the University of Greenwich from 1992 to 1997. He was Priest in charge at St Matthew, Yiewsley, from 1997 to 2001; and Team Rector of Plymstock from 2001 to 2012. He was Chaplain at St Philip and St James, Palma de Mallorca from 2012 to 2019.

Church of England titles
Preceded by Geoff Johnston	Archdeacon of Gibraltar; 2020–present	Incumbent
Preceded by Vickie Sims	Archdeacon of Italy and Malta; 2020–present	Incumbent
