= Geoff Johnston =

English Church of England priest

Geoffrey Stanley Johnston (called Geoff; 7 November 1944 - 9 March 2025) was a Church of England priest serving as Archdeacon of Gibraltar, in the Diocese in Europe.

== Education and training ==
Born in 1944, Johnston entered Kelham Theological College in 1964, beginning to train for the priesthood at age 20. He subsequently gained a Certificate in Education (CertEd) from Birmingham University in 1978 and a Master of Business Administration (MBA) from Aston University in 1981.

== Ministry ==
He was ordained in the Church of England: made a deacon in Advent 1968 (22 December) by Richard Clitherow, Bishop of Stafford, at St Luke's Church, Blakenhall and ordained a priest the following Advent (19 December 1969), by William Parker, Bishop of Shrewsbury, at St Matthew's Church, Walsall. He served his first curacy at Blakenall Heath (in Walsall, Staffordshire) until 1972, when he went for a year to serve St Buryan with St Levan and Sennan (at Land's End, Cornwall), before returning to Blakenall Heath.

Remaining in the West Midlands, Johnston next served as priest-in-charge of St Stephen's Church, Willenhall, from 1975, until the next year, when he moved to West Bromwich: he served All Saints and St Mary Magdalene until 1977, and became a lecturer at West Bromwich College of Commerce and Technology in 1978. From 1982, he served in Dudley borough for 26 years: first as an industrial chaplain and Team Vicar of St John the Baptist, Halesowen until 1994. He became a self-supporting minister at St Francis, Dudley, where he became priest-in-charge in 1999; he additionally served as priest-in-charge of the Church of St Edmund, Dudley from 2004, until his retirement in 2008.

=== Retirement ===
On first retiring, Johnston became Chaplain (i.e. parish priest) of Nerja and Almuñécar, Spain, for the Church of England Diocese in Europe. He became one of the Area Deans of Gibraltar Archdeaconry in January 2013, and was (additionally) commissioned Acting Archdeacon of Gibraltar and collated a Canon at Gibraltar Cathedral that November. On 17 October 2014, around the time he resigned the chaplaincy, he was re-licensed to the Archdeaconry, this time on a more long-term basis. In February 2019, he took on the extra role of Acting Archdeacon of Italy and Malta. On 6 November 2019, the eve of his 75th birthday, Johnston retired again.

Johnston died in 2025, aged 80.

Church of England titles
Preceded by David Sutch	Archdeacon of Gibraltar; 2014–2019	Succeeded by David Waller
