= Buckton =

Buckton may refer to:

== Places ==
- Buckton, East Riding of Yorkshire, a village in the East Riding of Yorkshire, England
- Buckton, Herefordshire, a hamlet in Buckton and Coxall civil parish, England
- Buckton, Northumberland, a village in Northumberland, England
- Buckton Castle, a medieval ringwork in Greater Manchester, England

== People ==
- George Bowdler Buckton (1818–1905), English entomologist
- John Buckton (born 1961), English rugby player
- Sir Peter Buckton (1350–1414), English politician
- Ray Buckton (1922–1995), English trade union official
- Thomas Buckton (1858–1933), Anglican archdeacon
- Edward Buckton Lamb (1806–1869), English architect
- William Buckton Andrews (1829–1918), Anglican clergyman
- Samuel Storey, Baron Buckton (1896–1978), English politician

== Fictional characters ==
- Charlie Buckton, a character in the Australian soap opera Home and Away
- Ruby Buckton, a character in the Australian soap opera Home and Away
