= St Mary's Church, West Derby, Liverpool =

St Mary's Church, West Derby
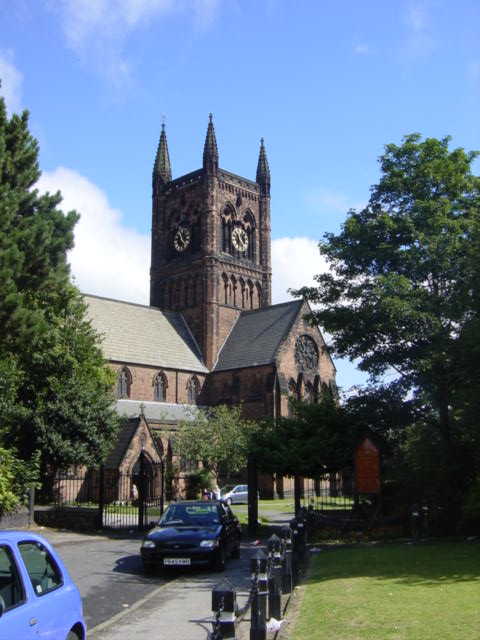
- St Mary's Church, West Derby, from the southwest

- Location in Merseyside
- 53.4334°N 2.9086°W
- OS grid reference: SJ 397 934
- Location: West Derby, Liverpool, Merseyside
- Country: England
- Denomination: Anglican
- Churchmanship: Liberal Catholic
- Website: St Mary, West Derby

History
- Status: Parish church

Architecture
- Functional status: Active
- Heritage designation: Grade II*
- Designated: 12 July 1966
- Architect: George Gilbert Scott
- Architectural type: Church
- Style: Gothic Revival (Geometric)
- Groundbreaking: 1853
- Completed: 1856

Specifications
- Materials: Sandstone, slate roofs

Administration
- Province: York
- Diocese: Liverpool
- Archdeaconry: Liverpool
- Deanery: West Derby
- Parish: St Mary, West Derby

Clergy
- Rector: Revd Stephen Boyd, Dip H.E., B.Th. (Oxon)
- Priest: Revd Jenny Bowen B.Sc.

St Mary's Church is in West Derby, a suburb of Liverpool, Merseyside, England. It is an active Anglican parish church in the deanery of West Derby, the archdeaconry of Liverpool, and the diocese of Liverpool. Its benefice is united with that of St James, West Derby. The church is recorded in the National Heritage List for England as a designated Grade II* listed building.

== History ==
St Mary's replaced a chapel of ease to St Mary's, Walton, which stood nearby and had been built in 1793. When it was demolished, evidence was found of Saxon material on the site. The land for the present church, which is located near the entrance to the main drive to Croxteth Hall, was given by the Earl of Sefton, who also donated £500 to the cost of the church. The Earl commissioned George Gilbert Scott to design it. The foundation stone was laid on 13 April 1853, and the church was completed in 1856. The large central tower was paid for by the banker John Pemberton Heywood.

== Notable former clergy ==
- John Waine - former Bishop of Chelmsford
- Myles Davies - former Canon Precentor and Vice-dean of Liverpool Cathedral
- Steven Brookes - Chaplain to Royal Hospital Chelsea and Chaplain to H.M King Charles III
- Jonathan Boardman - former chaplain of All Saints' Church, Rome and Archdeacon of Italy and Malta
- Gerwyn Capon - Archdeacon of Montgomery Archdeaconry of Montgomery

== Architecture ==
=== Exterior ===
The church is constructed in red sandstone, with pillars of Yorkshire stone in the interior, and with slate roofs. Its architectural style is Geometric. The plan consists of a five-bay nave with a clerestory, north and south aisles, north and south porches, north and south transepts with a central tower at the crossing, a three-bay chancel with an apsidal east end, north and south chapels, and a south vestry. At the west end of the nave is a doorway with a four-light window above it, and each aisle contains a two-light west window. The windows along the sides of the aisles have three lights, and those along the clerestory have two lights. The north transept has a four-light north window, and a stair turret with a pinnacle to the west. In the south wall of the south transept are three two-light windows with a rose window above. The tower is in two stages, with octagonal turrets at the corners surmounted by crocketed pinnacles. On each side of the lower stage of the tower is a five-bay blind arcade, and in the upper stage are pairs of two-light bell openings, with a canopied niche above. In the chancel are two-light windows, and the chapels each has a three-light east window and two-light windows on the sides.

=== Interior ===
Inside the church the nave arcades are carried on circular piers. and the capitals are carved with foliage. Between the chancel and the south chapel is a two-bay arcade carried on quatrefoil piers. Most of the fittings were designed by J. Oldrid Scott; these include the stalls, the altar rails, the pulpit and its tester. alterations to the reredos, the font cover, and the panelling in the sanctuary. The sanctuary lamp was designed by George Gilbert Scott, Junior. Much of the stained glass is by Hardman, although that in the west window is by William Wailes, and elsewhere by Percy Bacon. In the floor of the chancel is a brass to Revd John Stewart, the first rector of the new church, who died in 1889. The original pipe organ had three manuals, and was made by Gray and Davison in 1860. This was replaced in 1891 by another three-manual organ by the same manufacturers. This was rebuilt in 1973 by Rushworth and Dreaper, and further additions were made to it in 1988 and in 2000 by David Wells. A further full rebuilding and modernisation of the organ was completed in 2012 by Principal Pipe Organs before returning to the care of David Wells in 2017.

== Organists/Directors of Music ==
- William Ridley FCO 1853-1878
- William Thomas Best 1878-1885
- John Thomas Hughes 1885-1909
- Edward Watson 1869-1931
- Clifford Marshall FRCO 1919-1922
- Thomas Heath 1922-1930
- Reginald John Brown 1930-1965
- Alan Martin 1965-1969
- Peter Miller ARCO 1969-2019
- Kevin Mulcahy 2019- (assistant organist since 1982)

== Service times ==
- Said Eucharist 8.00am every Sunday
- All age service 9.00am every Sunday
- Choral Eucharist 10.00am every Sunday
- Choral Evensong 6.00pm first Sunday in the month
- Said Eucharist 10.00am every Wednesday
- Other services as announced

== See also ==
- List of new churches by George Gilbert Scott in Northern England
- Grade II* listed buildings in Liverpool – Suburbs
