= List of churches in Bern =

This is a list of churches in Bern, Switzerland.

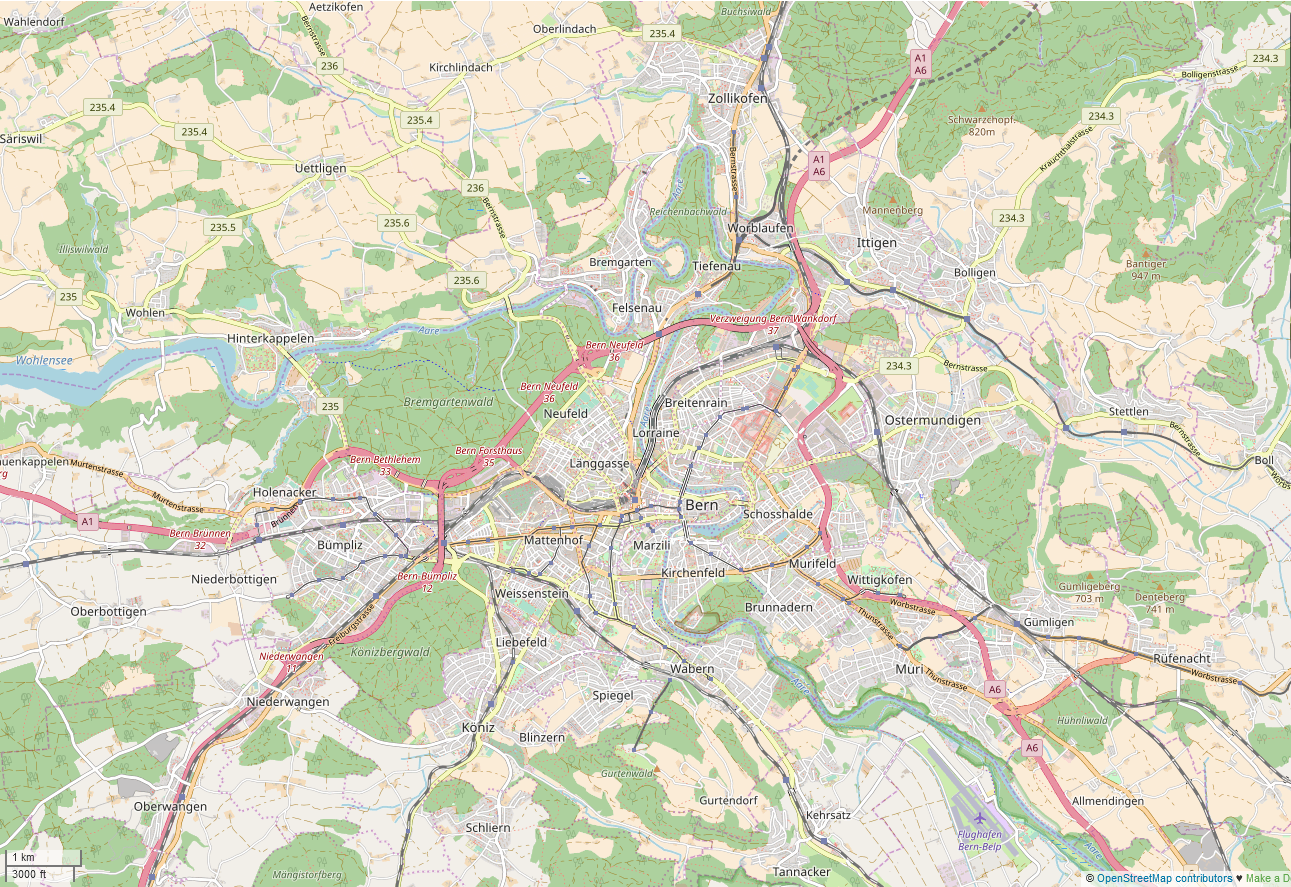
Churches in Bern
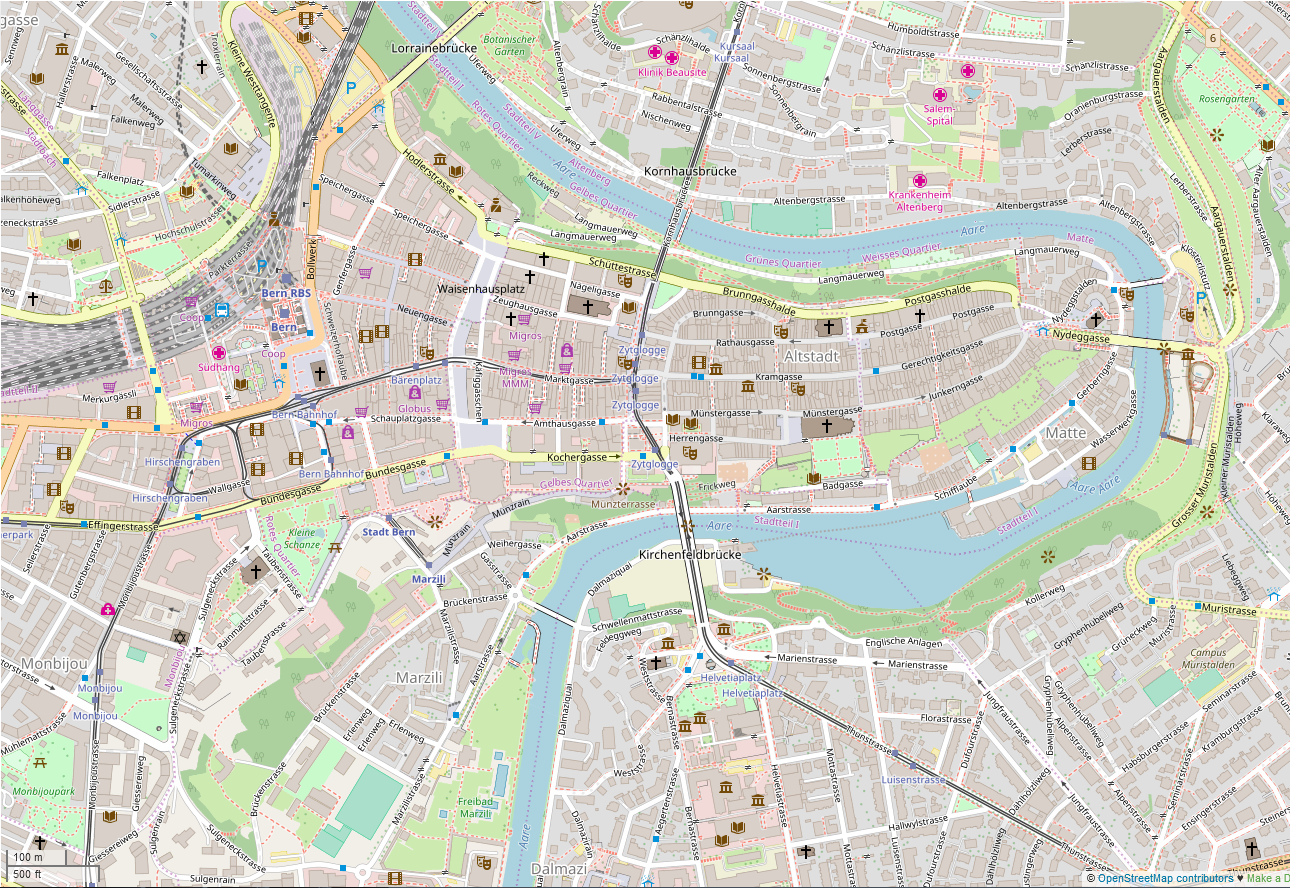
Churches in Bern

Image	Name	Location	Built	Denomination	Notes	Ref.
	Kirche Bruder Klaus	Ostring 1; 46°56′31.73″N 7°27′58.77″E	1953–1954	Roman Catholic	Named after Nicholas of Flüe.	
	Trinity Church; Dreifaltigkeitskirche	Taubenstrasse 6; 46°56′42.5″N 7°26′21.5″E	1896–1899	Roman Catholic	Built in order to replace the Church of St. Peter and Paul for Bern's Roman Catholics.	
	French Church; Französische Kirche	Zeughausgasse; 46°56′56.04″N 7°26′47.96″E	c. 1180–1200	Swiss Reformed	Known as Predigerkirche until 1623, when it was named after a French parish priest who was appointed that year.	
	Church of the Holy Ghost; Heiliggeistkirche	Spitalgasse; 46°56′52.41″N 7°26′26.83″E	1726–1729	Swiss Reformed	One of largest Swiss Reformed church buildings in Switzerland.	
	International Church of Bern	Nägeligasse 9; 46°56′56″N 7°26′31″E		Non-denominational	English-speaking.	
	Bern Minster; Berner Münster	Münsterplatz; 46°56′50″N 7°27′05″E	1421–1893	Swiss Reformed	Tallest church building in Switzerland. Also known as Münster St. Vinzenz.	
	Nydeggkirche	Burgtreppe; 46°56′55.49″N 7°27′26.04″E	1341–1504	Swiss Reformed	Nydegg is a Bernese German expression for "lower corner".	
	St. Paul's Church; Pauluskirche	Freiestrasse 8; 46°57′10.49″N 7°25′48.8″E	1902–1903	Swiss Reformed		
	Church of St. Peter and Paul; Kirche St. Peter und Paul	Rathausgasse 2; 46°56′55.38″N 7°27′5.55″E	1858–1864	Christian Catholic		
	St Ursula's Church	Jubiläumsplatz 2; 46°56′24.2″N 7°27′12.1″E	1905–1906	Anglican (Diocese in Europe)	Also known as the English Church.	
