= Brian Matthews =

Brian Matthews may refer to:

- Brian Matthews (actor) (born 1953), soap opera actor
- Brian Matthews (biochemist) (born 1938), Australian biochemist
- Brian Matthews (writer) (born 1936), Australian biographer and academic
- Brian Matthews (priest), Archdeacon of the Riviera
- Brian Matthews, artist, creator of online animated cartoon Stone Trek
- Bryan Matthews (1906–1986), British professor of physiology

== See also ==
- Brian Matthew (1928–2017), English broadcaster
- Brian Mathew (born 1936), botanist
