= Gilbert Sissons =

Gilbert Holme Sissons (20 March 1870 – 27 December 1940) was Archdeacon of Gibraltar from 1916 to 1929; and of Italy and the French Riviera from 1929 to 1934.

== Biography ==
Sisson was born in Barton, Lincolnshire in 1870, the son of William Harling Sissons, a surgeon. He attended Sir John Nelthorpe Grammar School in Brigg, and subsequently graduated from Pembroke College, Cambridge, in 1892, and was made deacon in 1896, the same year in which he received his M.A. During a curacy at St Luke's, Leicester, he was ordained as a priest in December 1897. From 1902 to 1905 he was a curate at Duddington, Northamptonshire.

He was appointed chaplain to the English congregation in Bern, Switzerland, at the end of 1904, and took up his post in April 1905. He stayed for a little over two years.

During this time, his mother, Jane Thompson Sissons, who was about 65, attended Professor Kocher's clinic, presumably for a goitre operation. Through her contact with the mother of a fellow patient, Mrs Castleman, the money which was being appealed for to build the new church of St Ursula's, Berne, at Jubiläumsplatz was eventually donated.

He subsequently moved to St John's, Menton, where he stayed from 1907 until 1916. He next moved to All Saints', Rome for four years, and became Rural Dean for Italy and Malta, as well as the French Riviera. In 1921 he moved to Venice, in 1922 to Alassio, and from 1932 to his retirement in 1934 he was at Bordighera.

He died on 27 December 1940.‘
