= Sutch =

Sutch is a surname. Notable people with this surname include:

- Bill Sutch (1907–1975), New Zealand economist, historian, writer and public servant
- Daryl Sutch (born 1971), football player
- David Edward Sutch, also known as Screaming Lord Sutch (1940–1999), English musician and politician
- David Sutch (priest) (born 1947), British archdeacon
- Richard Sutch (1942–2019)
- Ronald Sutch (1890–1975), British archdeacon
