= Gordon Reid (priest) =

Scottish Anglican priest (1943–2025)

The Reverend Canon Gordon Reid
- Born: William Gordon Reid; 28 January 1943; Hawick, Scotland
- Died: 19 March 2025 (aged 82); Philadelphia, Pennsylvania, U.S.
- Citizenship: United Kingdom
- Education: University of Edinburgh (MA); Keble College, University of Oxford (BA); Cuddesdon Theological College
- Occupation: Anglican priest
- Employer: Saint Clement's Church, Philadelphia (Rector)
- Title: Canon Emeritus of St Paul's Pro-Cathedral, Valletta, Malta

William Gordon Reid (28 January 1943 – 19 March 2025) was an Anglican priest and the Dean of Gibraltar and Vicar General of the Diocese of Gibraltar in Europe.

== Biography ==
Reid was born in Hawick, Scotland and educated at Galashiels Academy in the Scottish Borders. He attended the University of Edinburgh where he studied French and German literature, graduating with an MA in 1963. He began his theological studies at the Scottish Episcopal Theological College in Edinburgh and went on to Keble College at the University of Oxford, receiving a BA in theology before completing his theological training at Cuddesdon Theological College, also in Oxford.

Reid was ordained to the priesthood in 1968 and began his ministry with a curacy at St Salvador's Edinburgh, after which he was a tutor at Salisbury Theological College. In 1972, he was named Rector of St Michael and All Saints, Edinburgh and served in that position until he was appointed Provost of Inverness Cathedral in 1984.

In 1988 Reid became a priest of the Diocese of Gibraltar in Europe, the diocese of the Church of England that encompasses all of continental Europe as well as Iceland, Morocco, Turkey and parts of the former Soviet Union. After serving as Chaplain of St Nicholas' Church in Ankara, Turkey, and Chaplain of St Peter and St Sigfrid's Church in Stockholm, Sweden, he was appointed Vicar General of the Diocese of Gibraltar in Europe in 1992 and Dean of Gibraltar in 1998. Reid was named Archdeacon of Italy and Malta in 2000 and served in that capacity until 2004, when he was appointed Rector of Saint Clement's Church, Philadelphia in the United States in 2004. He retired in 2014 as Rector and was Rector Emeritus until his death on 19 March 2025, at the age of 82.

He was created a Companion of the Roll of Honour of the Memorial of Merit of King Charles the Martyr in 2017.

Anglican Communion titles
| Preceded by Arthur Wheatley | Provost of St Andrew's Cathedral, Inverness; 1984–1988 | Succeeded by Alan Avery Allen Horsley |
| Preceded by Brian William Horlock | Dean of Gibraltar; 1997–2000 | Succeeded by John Kenneth Robinson |
| Preceded by Bill Edebohls | Archdeacon of Italy and Malta; 2000–2003 | Succeeded by Arthur Siddall |
