= David Sutch =

David Sutch may refer to:

- Screaming Lord Sutch (David Edward Sutch, 1940–1999), English musician and politician
- David Sutch (priest) (born 1947), Archdeacon of Gibraltar
