= Edward Burrow (priest) =

English divine and miscellaneous writer (1785-1861)

Edward John Burrow, D.D, F.R.S (1785 – 8 August 1861) was an English divine and miscellaneous writer.

== Biography ==
A member of Magdalene College, Cambridge, he graduated with a B.A. in 1805 and M.A. in 1808. He then continued his studies at Trinity College, Oxford, and took the degrees of B.D. and D.D. in 1820. He was incumbent of Bempton, Yorkshire, 1810–16, and minister of a chapel at Hampstead 1816–23. He then became domestic chaplain to Tomline, bishop of Winchester. In July 1827 he accepted the office of principal of a college and school at Mount Radford, Exeter, and began his duties on 29 September 1827. In consequence of disputes with the proprietors he resigned or was dismissed from this office (the immediate cause of his leaving depends on the rights of the case) in the following January.

In 1835, Burrow went out to Gibraltar as civil chaplain, and was appointed Archdeacon of Gibraltar in 1842. Having remained there until his health became feeble, he then returned to England in 1859 and resided at Lyme Regis and other places on the south coast. He died at Honiton on 8 August 1861. and his wife, Emma Margaret, died on 10 June 1871.

== Works ==
- Elements of Conchology ( 1815)
- The Elgin Marbles (1817, 1837)
- A Letter … to W. Marsh … on the nature … of certain principles … falsely denominated Evangelical (1819), A Second Letter (1819)
- A Summary of Christian Faith and Practice (1822)
- Questions on Memorial Scripture Copies (1829)
- Hours of Devotion, translated from the German of Heinrich Zschokke (1830)
- School Companion to the Bible (1831)
