= Skemp =

Skemp is a surname. Notable people with the surname include:

- Bob Skemp, Canadian football player
- Richard Skemp, British mathematician, psychologist and academic
- Stephen Skemp (1912–2004), British clergyman
- Susan Skemp, American mechanical engineer
- Terence Skemp (1915–1996), British lawyer
- Tom Skemp (1897–1977), American multi-sport athlete and coach

== See also ==
- Franciscan Skemp Medical Center
