= Ambrose Hardy =

English Anglican priest (1842–1921)

Ven. Edward Ambrose Hardy (18 April 1842 – 9 September 1921) was an English Anglican priest who was Archdeacon of Malta from 1889–97.

Hardy was born in Clare, Suffolk and was educated at Trinity College, Dublin (B.A., 1869). He was ordained in 1872. After a curacy at Holy Trinity, Coventry, he was Secretary of the Curates' Augmentation Fund. He was a Chaplain in Cyprus before moving to Malta in 1878, where he would be the government chaplain until 1896. From 1881–96, he was chaplain at Valletta and Sliema before being Archdeacon of Malta from 1889–97.

During his tenure at Malta, whose population is primarily Roman Catholic, Hardy compiled a report on before of the Anglican Church concerning mixed marriages of Anglicans and Catholics, which was a sensitive issue at the time. The extensive report he compiled included details of all the marriages in Malta since it became a British colony in 1814.

In 1875, Hardy married Helen Jessie Alfreda Wilson, daughter of Alfred William Wilson, who was vicar of Holy Trinity Church when Hardy was a prelate in Coventry. She died in Malta in 1894.

In his retirement, Hardy lived at the Holy Trinity vicarage in Warwick. He remained active in the parish, frequently conducting services. He was an enthusiastic cricketer, gardener, and stamp collector.
