= Westwell =

Westwell may refer to:

== Places ==
- Westwell, Kent
- Westwell, Oxfordshire

== People with the surname ==
- George Westwell (1931–2001), Archdeacon of Malta
- Simon Westwell (born 1961), English footballer
