= Wanstall =

Wanstall is a surname. Notable people with the surname include:

- Charles Wanstall (1912–1999), Australian politician and judge
- Douglas Wanstall (1899–1974), British Anglican clergyman
- Norman Wanstall (born 1935), British sound editor
