= Thomas Le Mesurier =

Thomas Le Mesurier may refer to:

- Thomas Le Mesurier (priest, born 1756) (1756–1822), British lawyer, cleric and polemicist
- Thomas Le Mesurier (RAF officer) (1897–1918), World War I flying ace
- Thomas Le Mesurier (priest, born 1785) (1785–1864), Anglican priest, Archdeacon of Malta
