= Jeremy Peake =

Archdeacon of Eastern Archdeaconry from 1995 to 2000

Jeremy Peake (October 21, 1930 – June 11, 2009) was Archdeacon of Eastern Archdeaconry from 1995 to 2000.

Evans was educated at Worcester College, Oxford and St Stephen's House, Oxford; and ordained in 1958. After a curacy in Eastbourne he served in South Africa, Zambia and Greece.
