= John Cleugh =

English Anglican priest (1793-1881)

John Cleugh, D.D. (26 March 1793 – 25 March 1881) was an English Anglican priest who was Archdeacon of Malta from 1865 until his death.

== Biography ==
Cleugh was born in Islington and was educated at Gonville and Caius College, Cambridge. He was ordained priest on 25 May 1823 at the Chapel Royal of St James's Palace by William Howley Bishop of London. He then became Chaplain to the Anglican community in Malta serving from 1824 until 1865. Between 1865 and 1881, he was Archdeacon of Malta. He also served as the first chancellor of St Paul's Pro-Cathedral, Valletta between 1844 and 1877. He died on 25 March 1881 in Valletta, Malta.
