= Daniel Collyer =

English Anglican priest (1848-1924)

Daniel Collyer (25 August 1848 – 25 July 1924) was an English Anglican priest Archdeacon of Malta from 1903 until 1905.

Collyer was born in 1848 in Little Shelford, Cambridge. He was educated at Rugby School and Clare College, Cambridge; and ordained in 1871.

After a curacy in Falkenham he was Vicar of Castle Acre then West Newton. He was Chaplain at Hyeres from 1890 to 1893; and then at Cannes until his appointment as Archdeacon. After his return from the Mediterranean he was the Incumbent at Wymondham then Bobbington.

He died in d Dedham, Essex in 1924.
