= Peter Potter =

British cleric (born 1946)

Peter Maxwell Potter (born 1946) is an Anglican priest.

Potter was born in 1946, educated at Swansea University, and ordained in 1985. Potter served curacies at Holy Trinity, Bradford on Avon then All Saints, Harnham. He was Priest in charge of St Nicholas, North Bradley, then Vicar of St Anne, Sale. He was Rector of Largs from 2000 to 2008; and Chaplain of St Ursula, Berne from 2008 to 2016. He was Archdeacon of Switzerland from 2009 to 2016; and from 2014 to 2016 acting archdeacon of Germany and Northern Europe.
