= Dirk van Leeuwen =

Anglican clergyman (born 1945)

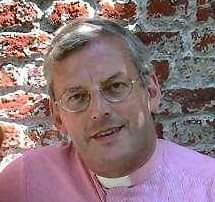

Dirk Willem van Leeuwen (born 1945) is an Anglican clergyman. He was Archdeacon of North West Europe from 2005 to 2007.

Van Leeuwen was educated at Utrecht University and at the Southwark Ordination Course. He was ordained priest in 1983. He served the Diocese in Europe at Brussels, Haarlem, Antwerp, Charleroi, Ypres Leuven, Knokke, Bruges and Ostend. He was Vicar general of the Diocese in Europe from 2002 to 2007.
