= Peter Sertin =

Archdeacon of Northern France

Peter Frank Sertin (1927-1997) was Archdeacon of Northern France from 1984 to 1985.

After a curacy at Christ Church, Beckenham he was Chaplain of King Edward's School, Witley then Vicar of St Paul, Maybury, Woking. He was at Christ Church, Chorleywood from 1969 to 1980, then St Michael, Paris from 1980 to 1985. After his time as Archdeacon he was the Rector at St Peter, Hambledon, Surrey from 1985 to 1989; and of Canford Magna from 1989 to 1994.
