= Arthur Cartwright =

English archdeacon

Arthur Babington Cartwright was Archdeacon of Malta from 1897 to 1901.

Cartwright was born in 1856, educated at Trinity College, Oxford and ordained in 1884. He served curacies in Bramshott, Ringwood and Mayfair. In 1895 he married Annie Isabella Chadwick at St Mary, Charlton-on-Otmoor. They moved to Valletta where he was Chaplain until his promotion to Archdeacon. He was Rector of Icklingham.
