= Lonsdale Ragg =

Lonsdale Ragg (23 October 1866 in Wellington, Shropshire – 31 July 1945 in Bath) was an Anglican priest and author.

Ragg was educated at Adams' Grammar School, Christ Church, Oxford and Ripon College Cuddesdon; Cuddesdon Theological College; and ordained in 1889.

After a curacy at All Saints', Oxford he was a tutor at Christ Church then vice-principal of Cuddesdon. He was warden of Bishop's Hostel, Lincoln and vice-chancellor of Lincoln Cathedral from 1899 to 1903. After this he was at various times Chaplain in Bologna, Venice, Valescure, Bordighera, Cannes and Rome. He became Archdeacon of Gibraltar and held the post until his death.

Ragg was also a published author. Amongst others he wrote "Aspects of the Atonement", 1904; "Dante and his Italy", 1907; "Things seen in Venice", 1913; "The Second Book of Samuel", 1919; "Commentary on St Luke", 1922; "Dante, Apostle of Freedom", 1922; "Some of My Tree Friends", 1931; "Evidences of Christianity", 1933; "Trees I Have Met", 1933; "Tree Lore in the Bible", 1935; "The Lyrical Woodlands", 1945; "Helps To Bible Teaching", 1960.
