= Peter Hawker (priest) =

English-Swiss priest

Peter John Hawker, OBE (born 1937) was Archdeacon of Switzerland from 2004 to 2006.

Hawker was educated at Exeter University and Wycliffe Hall Oxford; and ordained in 1971. He was Assistant Chaplain at Bern from 1970 to 1976; and Chaplain of Bern with Neuchâtel from 1976 to 1989; and Zurich from 1990.
