= Ken Robinson (priest) =

Anglican priest (1936–2020)

John Kenneth Robinson

Orders
- Ordination: 1963

Personal details
- Born: 17 December 1936
- Died: 5 August 2020 (aged 83) Lancashire
- Denomination: Anglicanism
- Occupation: Anglican priest
- Education: Balshaw's Grammar School, Leyland
- Alma mater: King's College London

John Kenneth Robinson (17 December 1936 – 5 August 2020) was an Anglican priest.

Robinson was educated at Balshaw's Grammar School, Leyland and trained for the priesthood at King's College London. He was ordained in 1963. After curacies at St Chad's Poulton-le-Fylde and Lancaster Priory, in 1966 he became a chaplain at St John's Army Children's School, Singapore and then the vicar of Holy Trinity, Colne. He then became Director of Education for the Diocese of the Windward Isles and then the vicar of St Luke's Skerton. After this he was a minor canon at St Edmundsbury Cathedral and then chaplain of Greater Lisbon. In 1994 he became the Archdeacon of Gibraltar and in 2000 its Dean. He resigned in 2003 and died on August 5, 2020, in Lancashire at the age of 83.

Church of England titles
Preceded by Gordon Reid	Dean of Gibraltar; 2000–2003	Succeeded by Alan Woods
