= Ernest Philpott =

English archdeacon (1864–1935)

Ernest Canteolo Burt Philpott (1864-1935) was Archdeacon of Malta from 1925 until his death.

Philpott was educated at the University of London and ordained in 1893. After curacies in Rotherhithe, Blackheath and Southwark he was Vicar at St Andrew, Catford from 1899 to 1921. During this time he was Mayor of Lewisham from 1906 to 1907. when he was appointed Commissary to the Bishop of Gibraltar.

He died on 3 February 1935.
