= Geoffrey Evans (priest) =

Welsh archdeacon (1934–2015)

Geoffrey Bainbridge Evans (1934–2015) was Archdeacon of the Aegean from 1978 to 1994.

Evans was educated at St. Michael's College, Llandaff; and ordained in 1959. After a curacy in Llandaff and Armley he served in Guyana, İzmir, Bornova and Ankara.

He died on 4 April 2015.
