= John Livingstone (priest) =

Anglican Archdeacon in France

John Morris Livingstone (12 December 1928- 20 March 2016) was an Anglican Archdeacon in France in the last decades of the 20th century.

Livingstone was educated at Radley College where he was a bright and intelligent literary pupil. He gained a scholarship to Peterhouse, Cambridge, where he tentatively intended to proceed to the bar. However after National Service he entered the church at Ripon College Cuddesdon; and took Holy Orders in 1955.

After a curacy in Hunslet he worked for the Society of the Faith until 1963. After that he held incumbencies in Notting Hill (including St Clement's Church, Notting Dale and All Saints, Notting Hill). He then served at Caen, Paris, Brussels and Nice; In 1975 he became Chaplain of St George's Anglican Church in Paris; his duties included being Archdeacon of Northern France from 1979 to 1984. Then he moved south to Nice as Archdeacon of the Riviera from 1984 to 1993, before moving to his last church in Biarritz. He retired in 2005 remaining in Biarritz until he died.
