= Christ Church, Vienna =

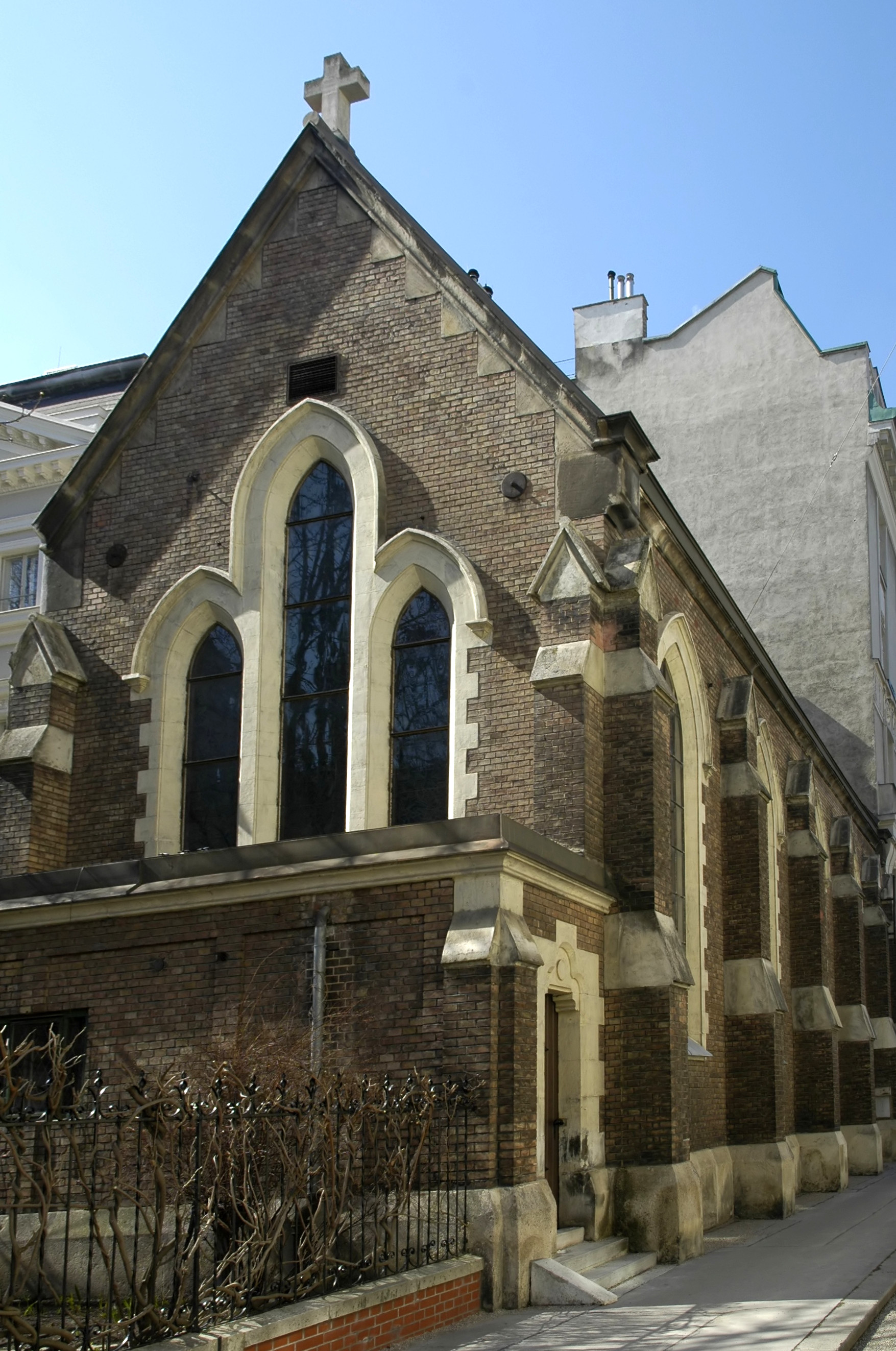
- Christ Church, Vienna
- 48.197271°N 16.381988°E
- Location: Vienna
- Country: Austria
- Denomination: Church of England
- Website: www.ccv-site.org/web/

History
- Consecrated: 11 June 1887

Architecture
- Functional status: Active
- Architect: Viktor Rumpelmayer
- Architectural type: Church
- Style: Gothic Revival

Specifications
- Length: 18 m (59 ft)
- Height: 15 m (49 ft)

Administration
- Diocese: Diocese of Gibraltar in Europe
- Archdeaconry: Eastern Archdeaconry

The Anglican church of Christ Church, Vienna is in central Vienna. Services are held in English. There have been 16 chaplains including William Hechler.

== Interior ==
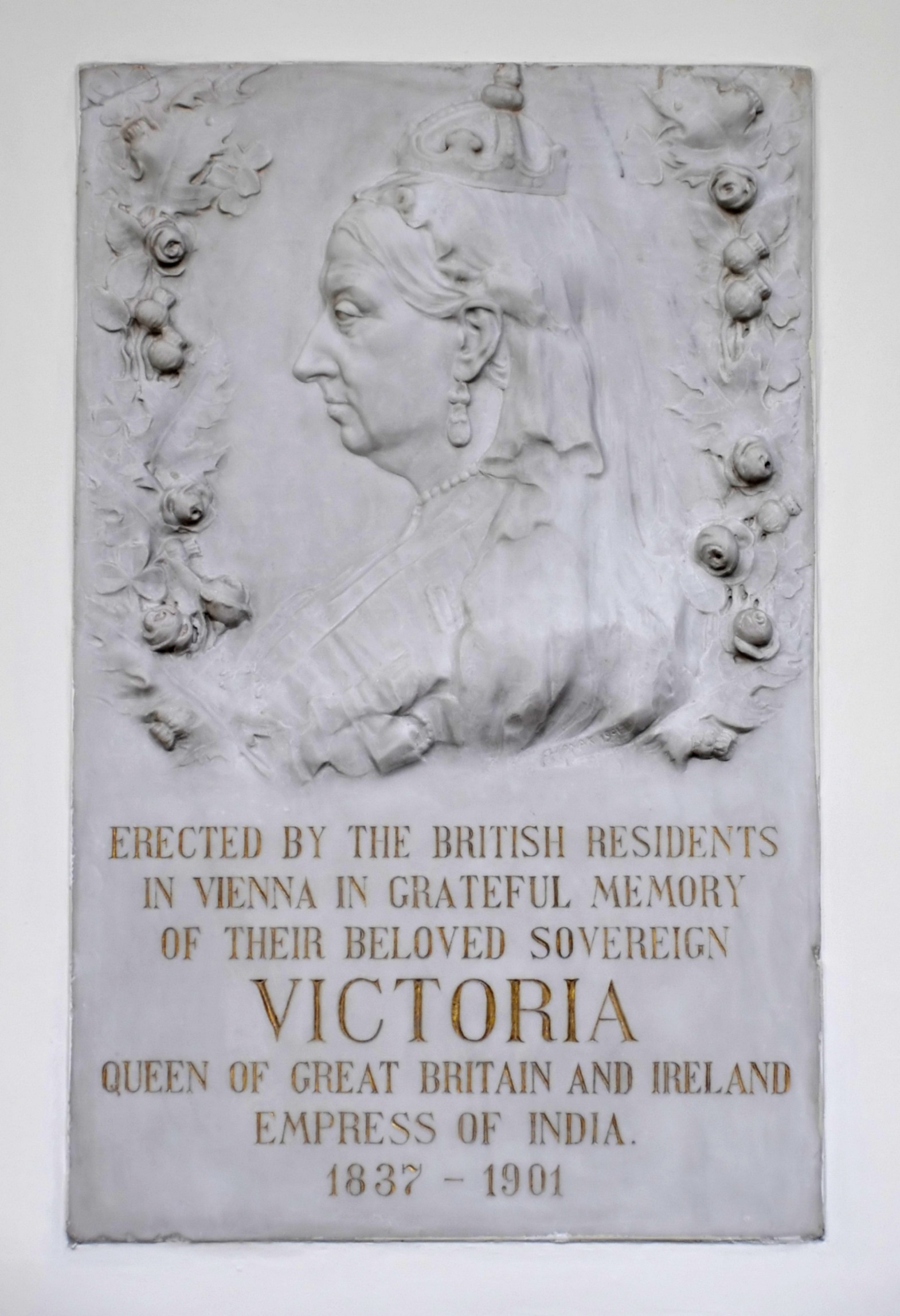
The marble relief of Queen Victoria

A marble relief by the sculptor Anton Hanak in the centre of the south wall commemorates Queen Victoria.

The original organ of 1897 was replaced in 1987.

== Gallery ==
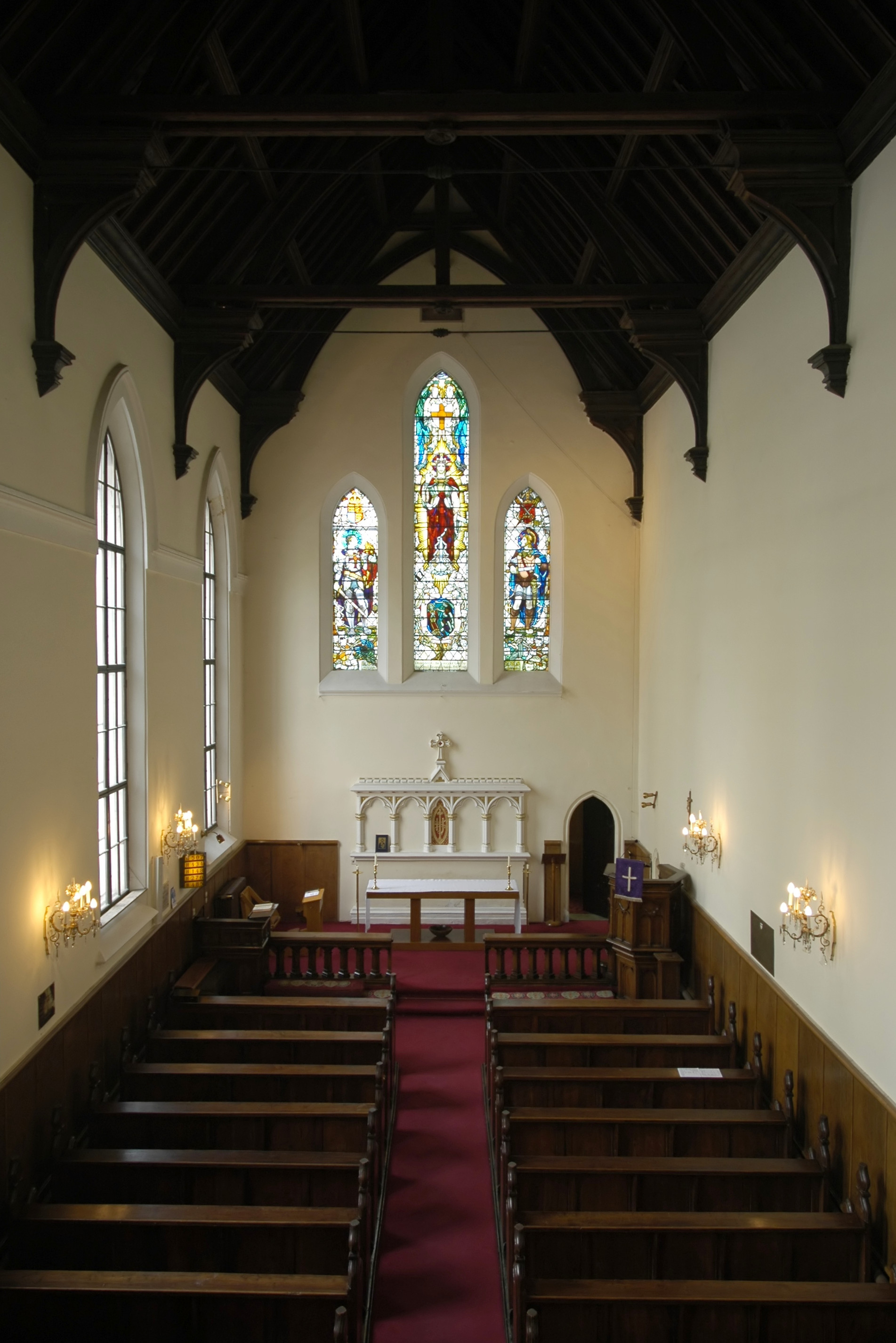
The church's interior

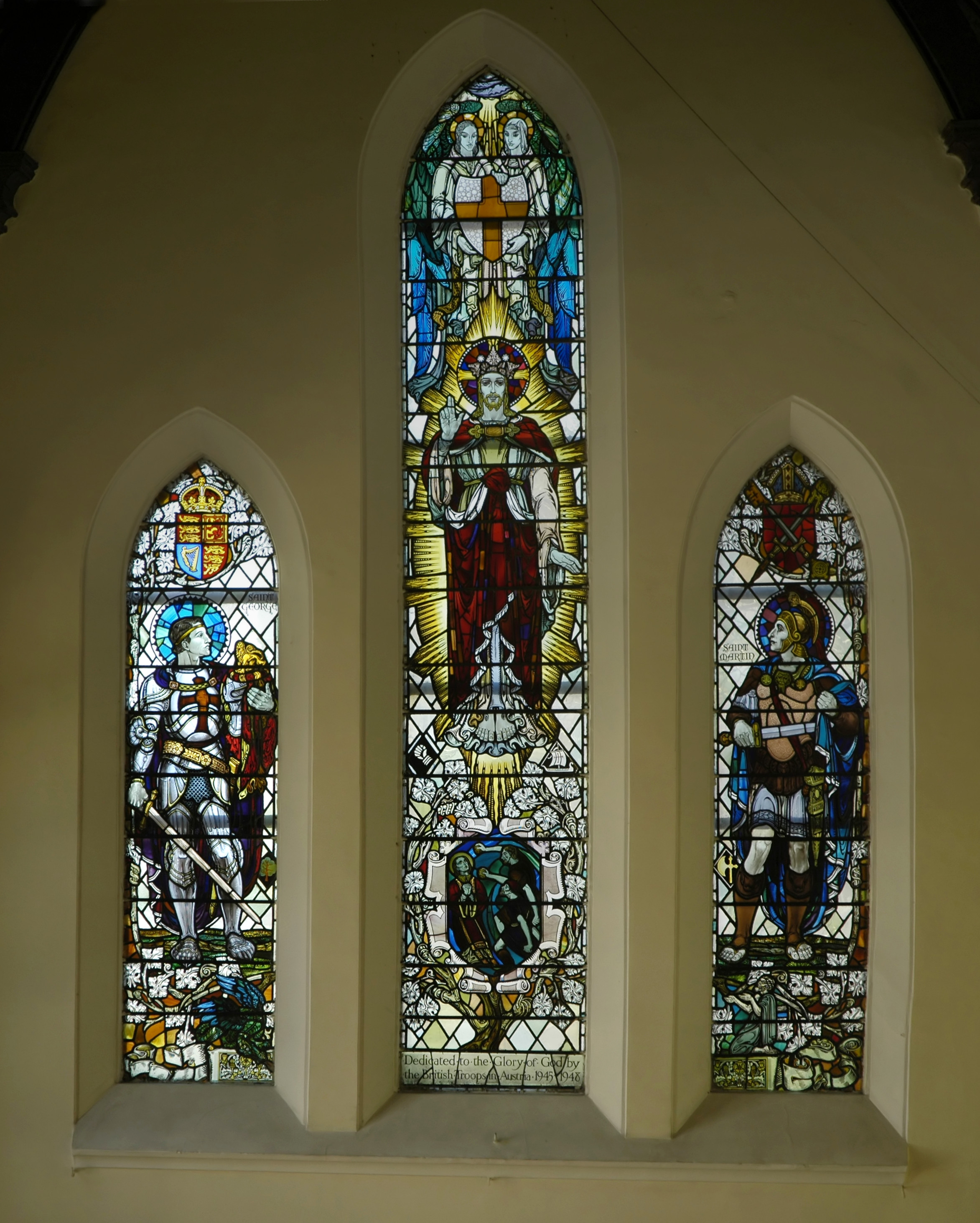
The east window above the altar

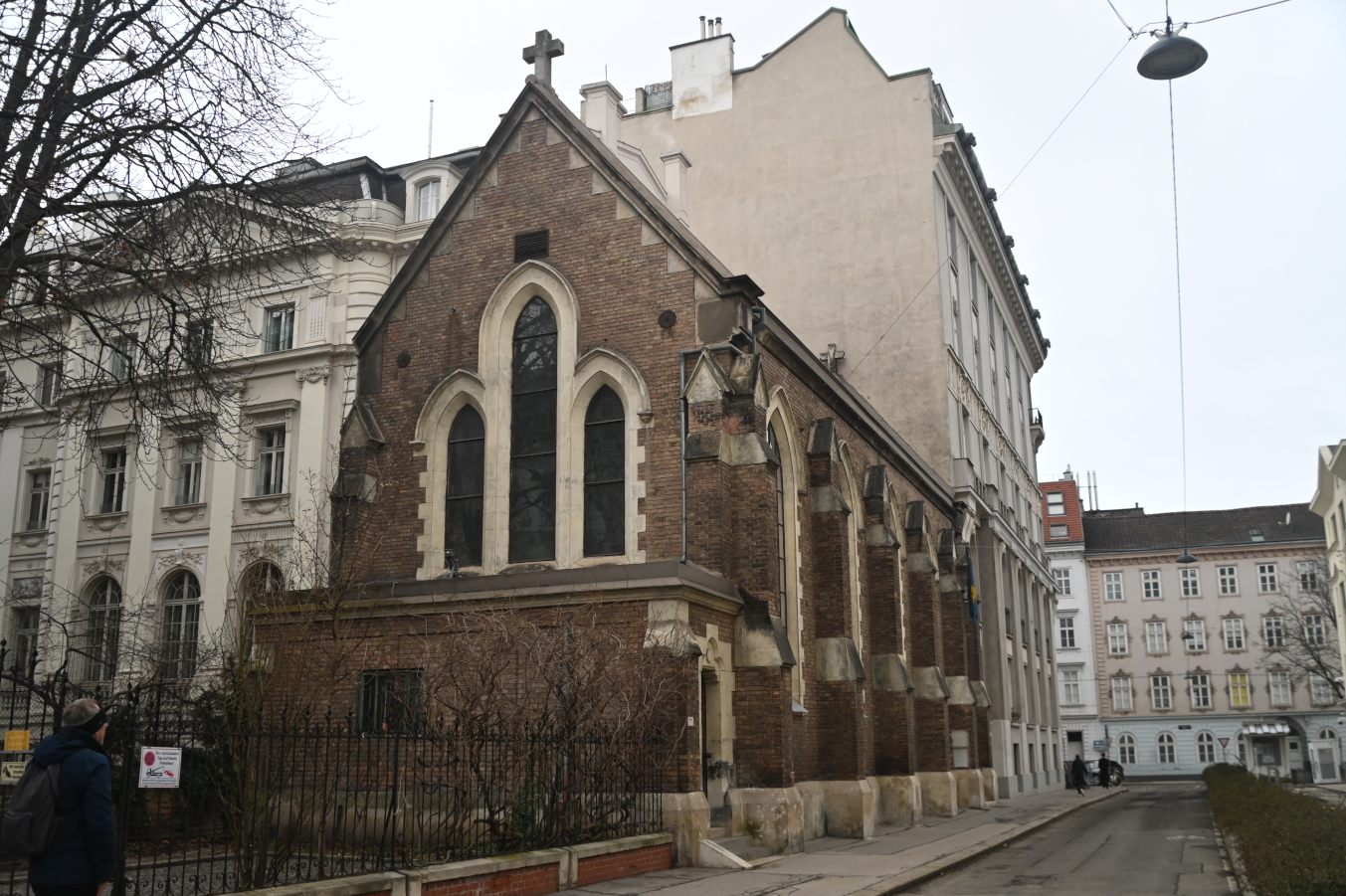
Christ Church The Anglican Church in Vienna

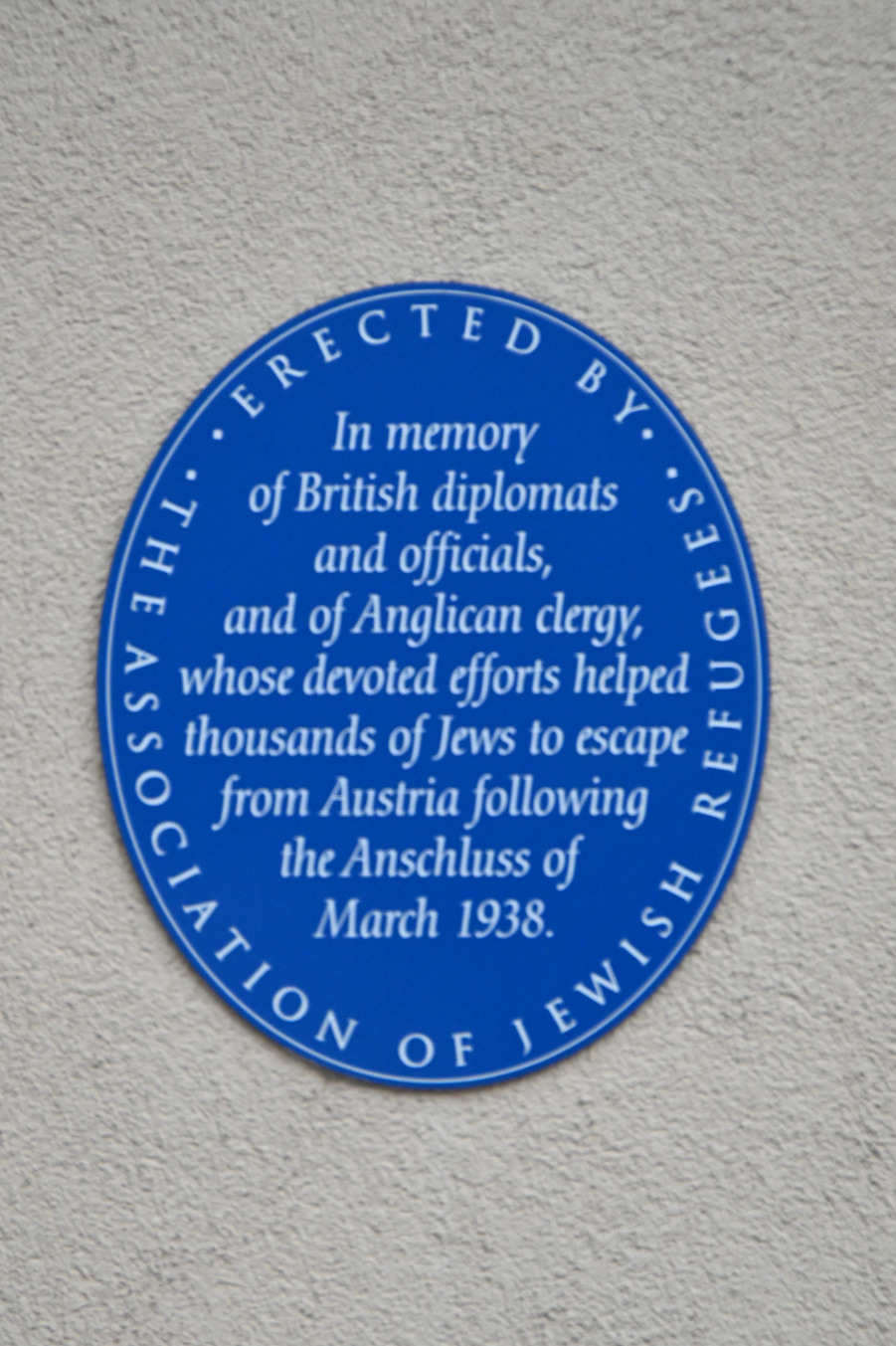
Memorial

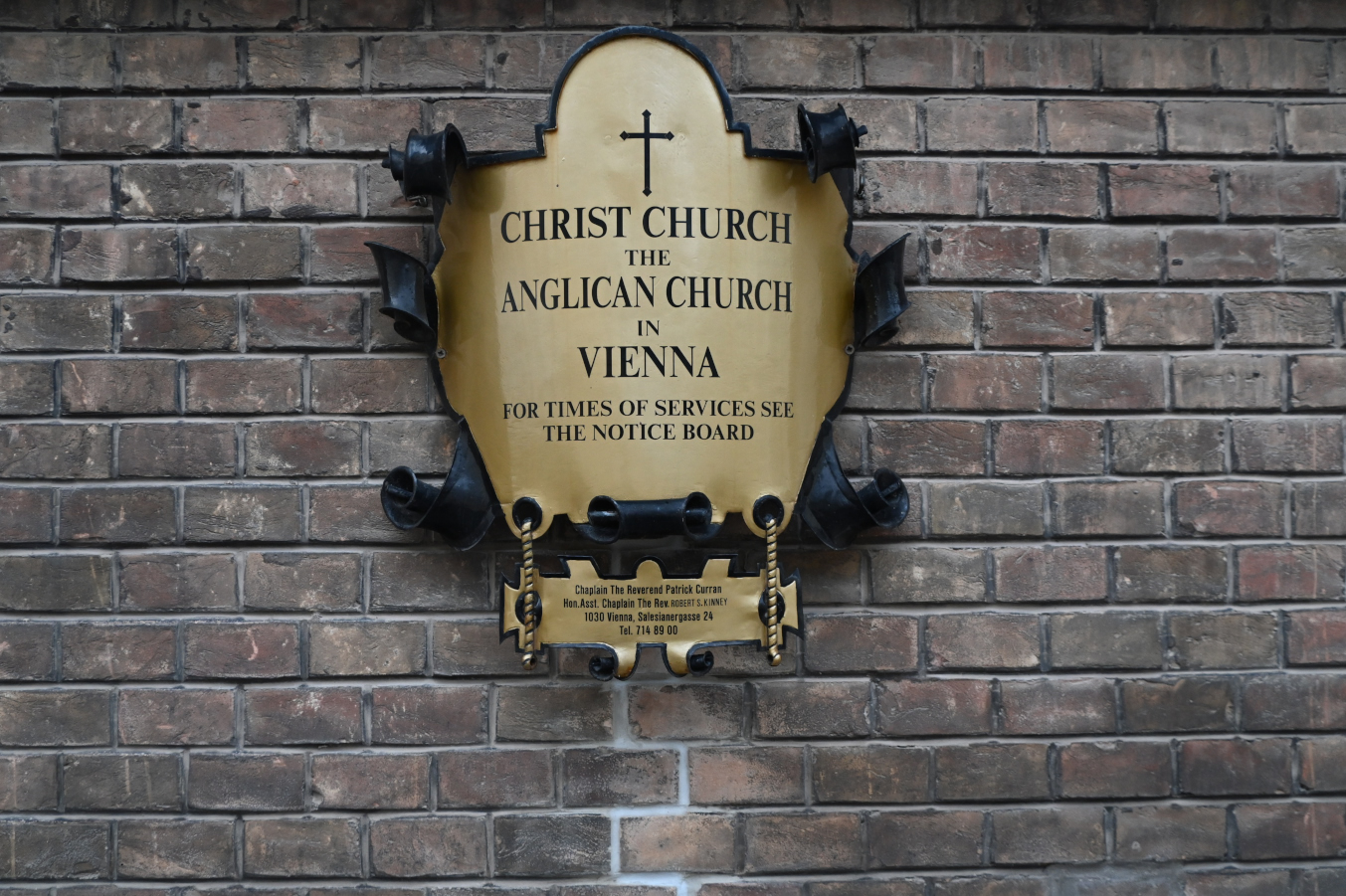
Christ Church Shield
