= Vickie Sims =

Priest of the Church of England, formerly an Archdeacon

- Church: Church of England
- Diocese: Diocese in Europe

Personal details
- Born: 1956 (age 69–70) Syracuse, New York, U.S.

Vickie Lela Sims (born 1956) is a Church of England priest who served as Archdeacon of Italy and Malta, 2016–2019.

Born in Syracuse, N.Y., Sims was educated at Iowa State University and Oxford University. She trained for ordination at Ripon College Cuddesdon and was ordained deacon at Lincoln Cathedral in 2002 and priest in 2003. After a curacy in Grantham she was priest-in-charge and later vicar at St Andrew's Church, Coulsdon, 2005-2014. Since 2014 Sims has been Chaplain of Milan with Lake Como. She is an Honorary Canon of the Cathedral Chapter, Diocese of Gibraltar in Europe.

Church of England titles
| Preceded by Jonathan Boardman | Archdeacon of Italy and Malta; 2016–2019 | Succeeded by David Waller |
