= Eric McLellan =

English archdeacon (1916–2010)

Eric Macpherson Thompson McLellan (1916–2010) was Archdeacon of Northern France from 1979 to 1980.

McLellan was educated at St John's College, Durham. After curacies in Byker and Fazakerley he was Vicar of Everton, Liverpool then Rector of Sevenoaks. He was Chaplain at the Embassy of the United Kingdom, Paris from 1970 to 1980.
