= Jonathan Boardman =

British Anglican priest

Jonathan Boardman (born 1963) is a British Anglican priest. He was Archdeacon of Italy and Malta from 2009 to 2016.

Boardman was educated at Magdalene College, Cambridge, Magdalen College, Oxford and Westcott House Cambridge. After a curacy at St Mary's Church, West Derby, Liverpool he was Rector of Catford and Area Dean of Lewisham. In 1999 he went to minister at All Saints' Church, Rome; and a year later became a tutor at the Anglican Centre in Rome. Boardman was an occasional diarist for the Church Times

Since 2018 he has been Vicar of St Paul's Church, Clapham. His book Rome, A Cultural and Literary History, with a foreword by Lisa St Aubin de Terán was published by Signal Books (Revised Second Edition 2006) ISBN 9781904955085.
