= James Johnston (priest) =

Archdeacon of Gibraltar, Europe

James Johnston (1890–1977) was Archdeacon of Gibraltar from 1950 to 1963.

Johnston was educated at University College, Galway. He was a teacher at Methodist College Belfast from 1920 to 1925. He chose however to train for the Anglican ministry. He was ordained deacon in 1918 and priest in 1920. After serving at Tyrella, County Down the rest of his career was spent overseas: at Gibraltar (including being Precentor of the Cathedral, 1934–45, and acting Dean during the War), Bilbao, Barcelona and finally back to Gibraltar.

Johnston died in 1977.
