= Ronald Jennison =

Archdeacon of the Riviera from 1982 to 1983

Ronald Bernard Jennison was Archdeacon of the Riviera from 1982 to 1983.

Jennison was educated at Chichester Theological College and ordained in 1960. After a curacy in Thornaby-on-Tees at Tewkesbury Abbey he held incumbencies at Hull, Bridlington and Sewerby. He then served at Marseille before his time as Archdeacon; and Finmere afterwards.
