= John Sharp (Archdeacon in South-Eastern Europe) =

John Herbert Sharp (Balmuir, 1888 – London, 1950) was Archdeacon in South-Eastern Europe from 1935 to 1947.

Sharp was educated at Balliol College, Oxford, and ordained in 1913. He began his career with a curacy at St Mark, South Farnborough. After this he was at St James, Edinburgh from 1917 to 1921. He then served at Naples, Valletta, and Gibraltar before his appointment as archdeacon.

He died on 27 January 1950.
