= St Margaret's Church, Angmering =

Church in West Sussex, England

Coordinates: 50.8289°N 0.4862°W

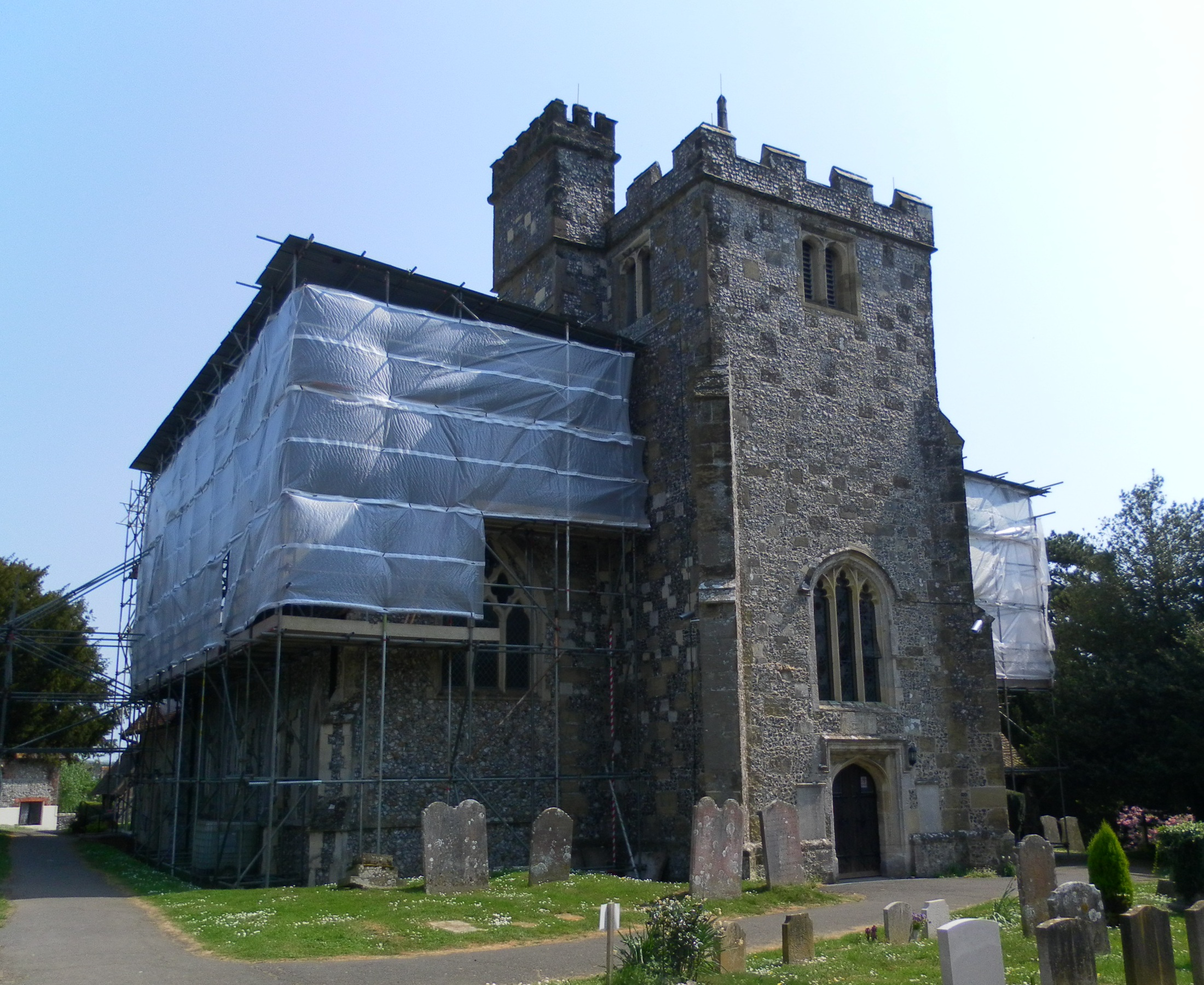
- St Margaret's Church, Angmering
- Country: England
- Denomination: Church of England
- Churchmanship: Evangelical

History
- Status: Active
- Dedicated: St Margaret of Antioch

Architecture
- Functional status: Parish church
- Years built: 13th century

Administration
- Diocese: Diocese of Chichester
- Archdeaconry: Archdeaconry of Chichester
- Deanery: Arundel and Bognor
- Parish: Angmering, Saint Margaret with Ham and Bargham

Clergy
- Rector: The Revd Mark Standen

St Margaret's Church is a Church of England parish church in Angmering, West Sussex. The church is a grade II* listed building.

== History ==
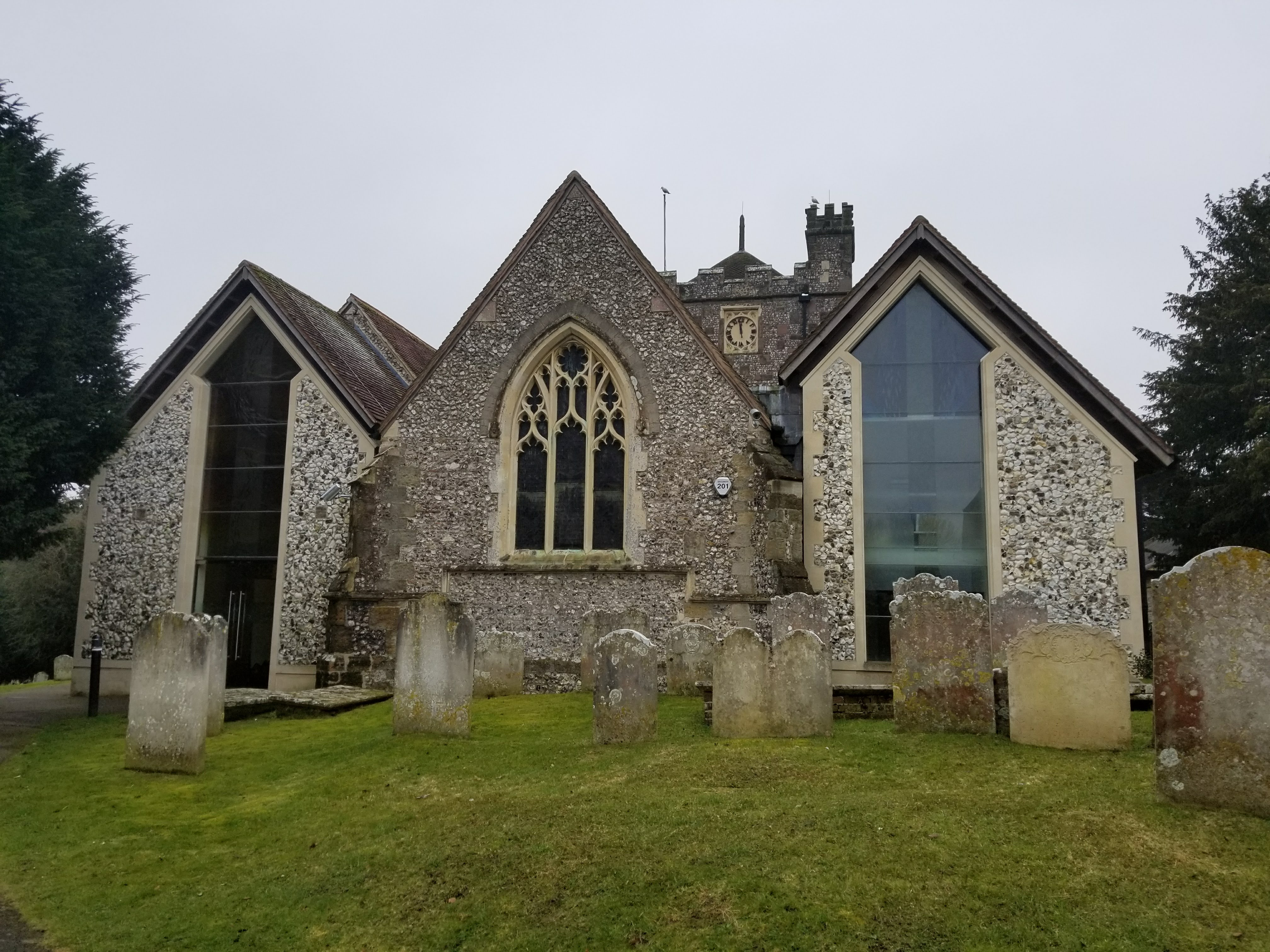
The frontside of St Margaret's Church

St Margaret's Church was built in the 13th century. A tower was added in 1507. The church was reordered by Samuel Sanders Teulon from 1852 to 1853.

On 12 October 1954, the church was designated a grade II* listed building.

=== Present day ===
St Margaret's stands in the conservative evangelical tradition of the Church of England.

== Notable clergy ==
- The Revd Jos Nicholl MC, decorated army officer who served as rector from 1982 to 1985
- The Revd Anthony Wells, later Archdeacon of France, served as rector from 1986 to 1998
- The Revd Mark Standen, is the rector up to the present.

== See also ==
- Grade II* listed buildings in West Sussex
- List of places of worship in Arun
