= Basil Ney =

Basil Ney, OBE was Archdeacon of Gibraltar from 1963 to 1987.

Ney was educated at Lichfield Theological College. After a curacy at Gnosall he was Precentor at Gibraltar Cathedral. From 1954 to 1959 he was Chaplain at St Bartholomew's Hospital; and from 1959 to 1963 Chaplain at Embassy of the United Kingdom, Madrid.
