= Brian Lea =

English archdeacon (born 1934)

(Montague) Brian Lea, OBE (born 1934) was Archdeacon of Northern France from 1986 to 1994.

Draper was educated at St John's College, Cambridge then St John's College, Nottingham. After curacies at Emmanuel Church, Northwood and St George, Barcelona he was Vicar of Hove then St Michael, Paris. After his time as Archdeacon he was the incumbent at East Hoathly Church then St and St Philip, The Hague.
