= Geoffrey Allen (priest) =

Archdeacon of North West Europe

Geoffrey Gordon Allen (born 1939) was Archdeacon of North West Europe from 1993 to 2004.

Allen was educated at Salisbury and Wells Theological College. He was ordained deacon in 1966 and priest in 1967. After a curacy at St Mary the Virgin, Langley Marish he was with the Mission to Seamen until 1970. He then served at Rotterdam, Voorschoten, The Hague, Arnhem, Nijmegen, Twenthe and Haarlem.
