= Thomas Sleeman =

Thomas Sleeman (1813–1896) was Archdeacon of Gibraltar from 1864 to 1869.

Sleeman was ordained in 1850. He was the Incumbent at St Andrew, South Tawton, before his time as Archdeacon; and Chaplain at Darmstadt afterwards. He died on 9 November 1896.
