= St Clement's Church, Notting Dale =

- Church of St Clement with St Mark, Notting Dale
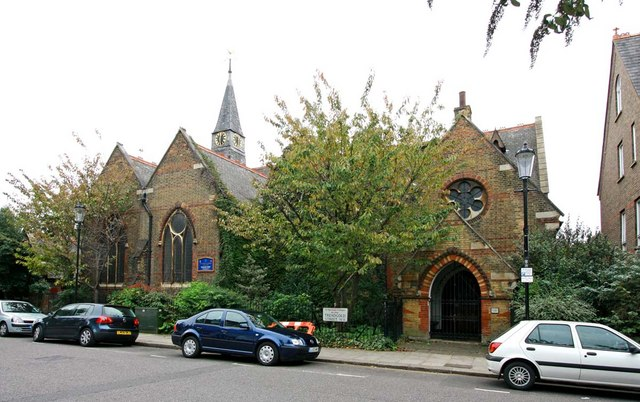
- St Clement's Church, Notting Dale
- 51.5121°N 0.2158°W
- Location: Treadgold Street, Notting Hill, London, W11 4BP
- Country: England
- Denomination: Church of England
- Churchmanship: Inclusive Anglo-Catholic

History
- Status: Active
- Dedication: St Clement and St Mark

Architecture
- Functional status: Parish church

Administration
- Province: Province of Canterbury
- Diocese: Diocese of London
- Archdeaconry: Archdeaconry of Middlesex

Clergy
- Vicar: The Revd Gareth Wardell

St Clement's Church is a Church of England parish church in Notting Hill, Royal Borough of Kensington and Chelsea, London. The church is a grade II listed building.

== History ==
The church was designed by James Piers St Aubyn, and was funded by the Reverend Arthur Dalgarno Robinson. It was consecrated in 1867.

In 1988, the church was used as a location in episode 15 of series 4 of The Bill, "Trespasses".

On 19 May 1994, the church was designated a grade II listed building.

=== Present day ===
The parish of "St. Clement with St. Mark, Notting Dale and St. James, Norlands" is part of the Archdeaconry of Middlesex in the Diocese of London. The church stands in the Inclusive Anglo-Catholic tradition of the Church of England.

The church was used as a relief centre for those affected by the Grenfell Tower fire on 14 June 2017.

== Notable people ==
- George Austin, later Archdeacon of York, was an assistant curate here from 1957 to 1959
- Kenneth Leech, honorary assistant curate from 1982 to 1988
- Sr Donella Mathie CSA, later Mother Superior of the Community of St. Andrew, deaconess from 1982 to 1984
- Keith Riglin, Bishop of Argyll and The Isles was associate vicar, 2008-11.

=== List of vicars ===
- 1867 to 1880: Arthur Dalgarno Robinson
- 1880 to 1886: Sir Edwyn Hoskyns, 12th Baronet, later Bishop of Burnley and Bishop of Southwell
- 1918 to 1952 Francis Edwin Baverstock
- 1953 to 1962 Ronald Arthur
- 1962 to 1968: William Mason
- 1968 to 1974: John Livingstone, priest-in-charge
- 1974 to 1977: Peter Jameson
- 1977 to 1988: David William Randall
- 1989 to 1994: Edward Burton
- 1995 to 2009: Hugh Rayment-Pickard
- 2010 to 2019: Prebendary Alan Everett
- 2020 to present: Fr Gareth Wardell

== Gallery ==
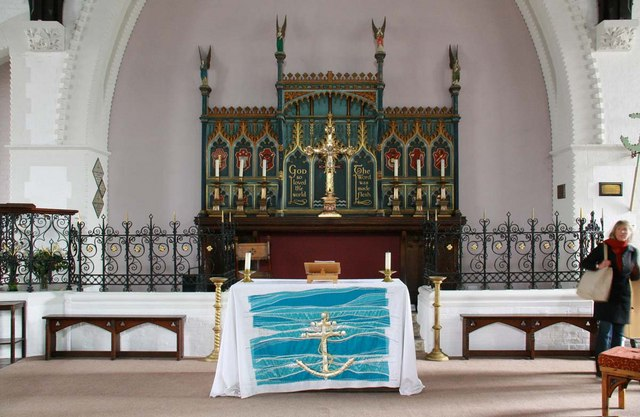
Sanctuary

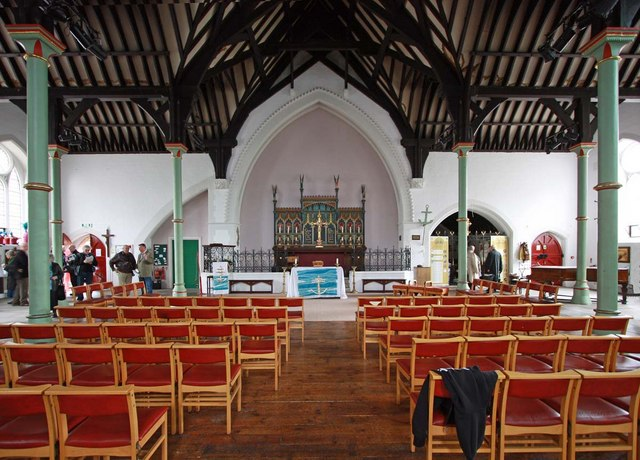
Nave

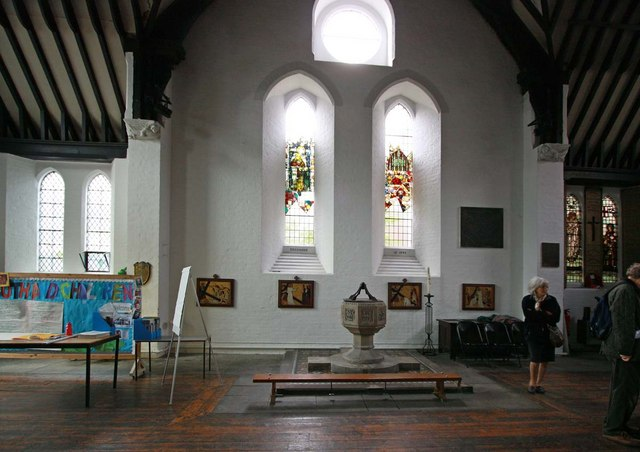
Font

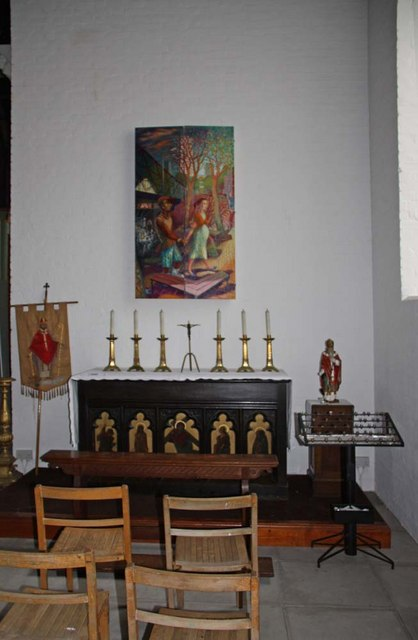
Side chapel

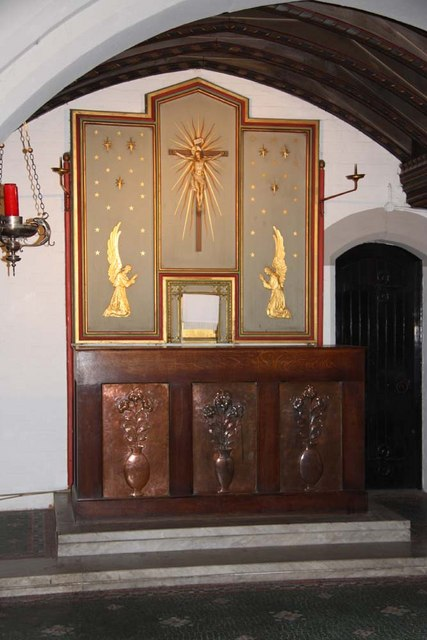
Side chapel
