= Leslie Nathaniel =

Leslie Satianathan Nathaniel (born 1954) is an Anglican priest.

Nathaniel was educated at Bangalore University, Jawaharlal Nehru University and Birmingham University. He was ordained in 2002. He worked for the Church Mission Society from 1999 to 2004. Since then he has worked in Germany. Nathaniel has been Archdeacon of the East, Germany and Northern Europe since October 2019.
