= Anthony Wells =

British archdeacon (born 1942)

Anthony Martin Giffard Wells (born 1942) was Archdeacon of France from 2002 to 2006.

Wells was educated at the Open University and St John's College, Nottingham; and ordained deacon in 1974 and priest in 1975. After a curacy in Orpington he was Priest in charge at Odell then Pavenham. He was Rural Dean of Sharnbrook from 1981 to 1986; and Rector of Angmering from 1986 to 1998. He then served at Paris and Gibraltar.
