= Brian Horlock =

English Anglican priest (1931–2022)

OBE Brian Horlock
- Predecessor: Anthony Lindsay Nind
- Successor: William Gordon Reid

Orders
- Ordination: 1957

Personal details
- Born: 1931
- Died: 20 December2022 (aged 90–91)
- Education: University of Wales, Lampeter

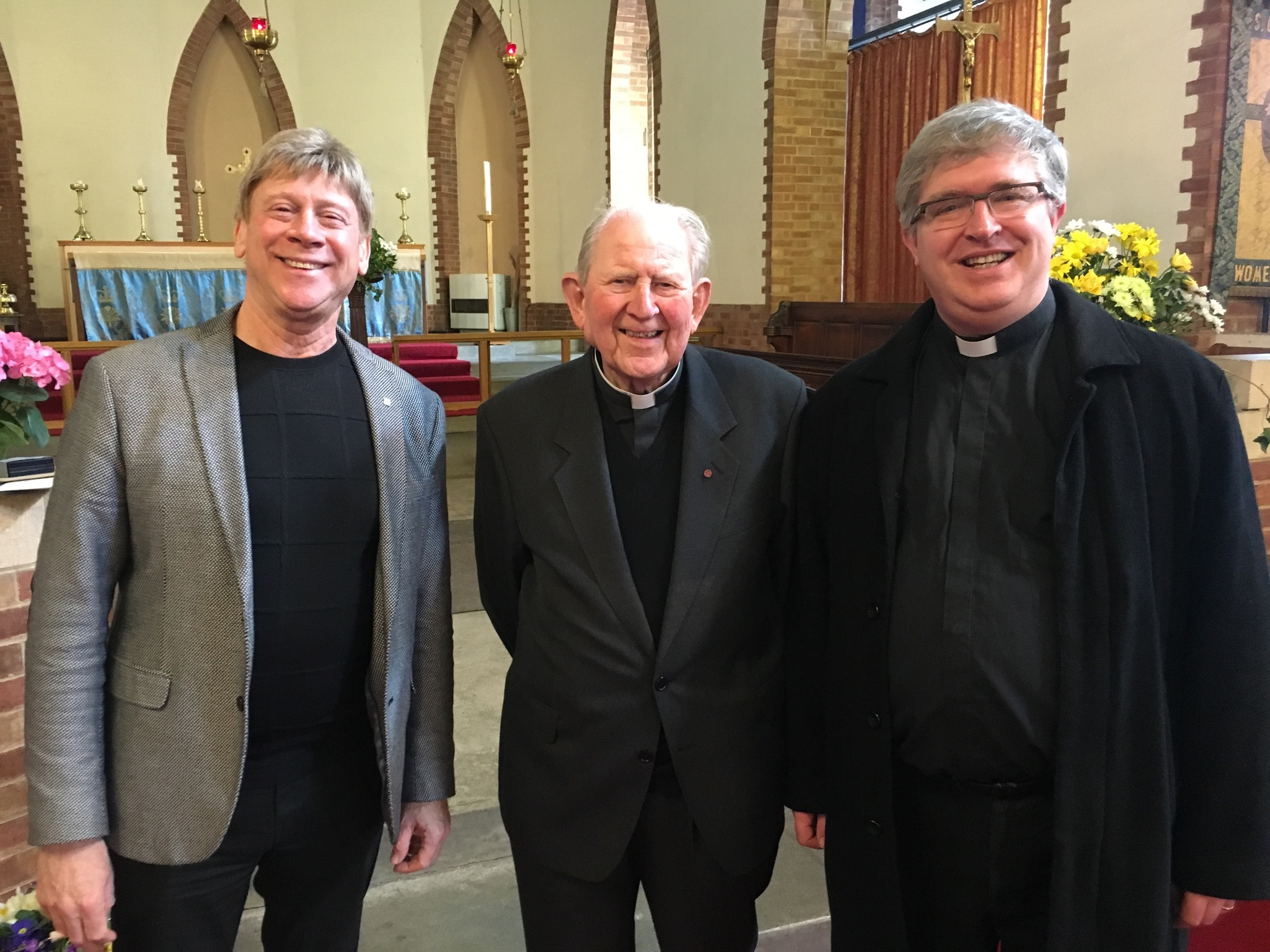
Horlock (centre) on a return visit to St Gabriel's Church, North Acton, with the present vicar and the director of music

Brian William Horlock OBE (1931 – 20 December 2022) was an English Anglican priest.

== Early life and education ==
Horlock was born in 1931, educated at the University of Wales, Lampeter, and ordained in 1957.

== Ordained ministry ==
Horlock was a curate in Chiswick and then in Witney until 1962. He was vicar of St Gabriel's Church, North Acton, until 1968 when he became the Anglican chaplain in Norway. In 1980, he was appointed Archdeacon of Scandinavia and in 1989 the Dean of Gibraltar, a post he held for nine years.

Horlock was appointed OBE in the 1978 New Year Honours.

== Personal life and death ==
Horlock was married to Rosemary, the daughter of the Rev. Prebendary George Lloyd, vicar of St Nicholas, Chiswick, under whom Horlock served as assistant curate from 1957 to 1961. In retirement Horlock lived in Royal Wootton Bassett and was an honorary assistant priest in the parish church. He was an opponent of the ordination of women as priests.

Horlock died on 20 December 2022, at the age of 91.

== Notes ==
Church of England titles
Preceded by Anthony Lindsay Nind	Dean of Gibraltar; 1989 – 1998	Succeeded by William Gordon Reid
