= Anthony Nind =

- Diocese: Diocese in Europe

Anthony Lindsay Nind, MBE (21 February 1926 – 5 January 2000) was an Anglican priest who served as Dean of Gibraltar from 1986 to 1988.

== Biography ==
Anthony Lindsay Nind was born on 21 February 1926. He was educated at Balliol and Cuddesdon and ordained in 1953. He held curacies in Devizes, Wareham and then Hong Kong until 1961. He then became the incumbent at Langton Matravers until 1968 when he moved to serve the Anglican Episcopal Church of Brazil. Later he became the Chaplain of Christ Church Vienna, Archdeacon of Switzerland and finally Dean of Gibraltar, a post held until 1988. Nind died on 5 January 2000, at the age of 73.

== Notes ==
Church of England titles
Preceded by Daniel John Rowlands	Dean of Gibraltar; 1986 – 1988	Succeeded by Brian William Horlock
