= Brian Matthews (priest) =

English archdeacon (1914–1997)

Brian Benjamin Matthews OBE (1914–1997) was Archdeacon of the Riviera from 1977 to 1982.

Matthews was educated at Hertford College, Oxford and ordained in 1938. After a curacy in Aldershot he was a Chaplain in the RNVR from 1941 to 1946. After another curacy at Tewkesbury Abbey he was Chaplain at Denstone College from 1948 to 1958. He then served at Monte Carlo, Gibraltar and Valletta.
