= Stephen Skemp =

English archdeacon (1912–2004)

Stephen Rowland Skemp (1912–2004) was Archdeacon of the Aegean from 1971 to 1977.

Skemp was educated at Wadham College, Oxford and Ripon College, Cuddesdon; and ordained in 1936. After a curacy in Hendon, he served in Bulawayo, Publow, Goxhill, Nunkeeling, Great Stanmore, Athens and Ankara.

He died on 30 June 2004.
