= Thomas Le Mesurier (priest, born 1785) =

(John) Thomas (Howe) Le Mesurier (18 August 1785 – 29 September 1864) was an Anglican priest in the 19th century.

Le Mesurier was born in Hackney, educated at Brasenose College, Oxford, became a chaplain to the forces in Malta and was appointed archdeacon of that island in 1834.

== Notes ==
Archdeacons in the Diocese in Europe
