= St Ursula's Church, Bern =

St. Ursula's Church
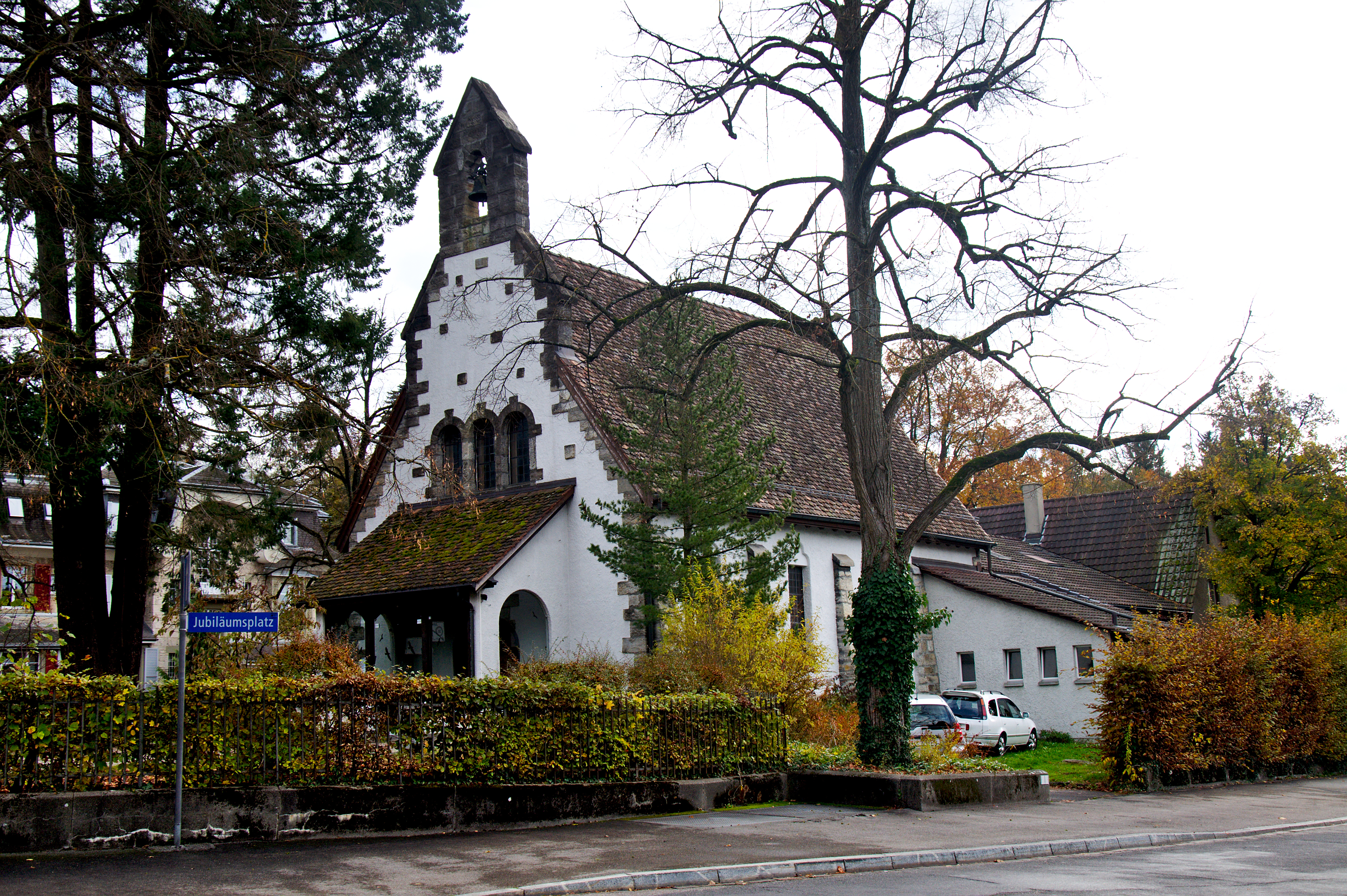
- St Ursula's Church, Bern

- Location within Switzerland
- 46.93996°N 7.45336°E
- Location: Bern
- Country: Switzerland
- Denomination: Anglican
- Website: https://www.stursula.ch

History
- Dedication: St Ursula

Administration
- Diocese: Europe
- Archdeaconry: Switzerland

St Ursula's Church, Bern is an Anglican Episcopal church in Bern, Switzerland.

The church is one of the ten Anglican chaplaincies in Switzerland that have a resident chaplain (minister) and together form the Archdeaconry of Switzerland.

== History ==
=== 19th Century ===
Between 1832 and 1847, the Chaplain from Christ Church, Lausanne held 21 services in Bern at the invitation of the British minister. These were probably held at the British Legation.

Hoteliers throughout Switzerland were eager to offer facilities for worship. In 1845, the Bernese authorities gave permission for English services to be held in the chapel of the Bürgerspital. A group of innkeepers undertook to pay the cost of bringing a chaplain from England. Twelve years later, the former deer-park outside the city walls was sold for redevelopment. The Cantonal Forestry department made a grant of land at the top of Hirschengraben for building an English church. Plans were drawn up in 1858 by the influential English architect, George Edmund Street, but although the community raised Fr 8454.50 towards the construction, this was not enough, and the grant was revoked.

In 1859, the Colonial and Continental Church Society undertook to support a chaplain in Bern. In 1887, funding was taken over by the Society for the Propagation of the Gospel. Services were held for a while in the Old Catholic church of St Peter and St Paul, but there were complications due to the bitterness felt by Roman Catholics against the Old Catholic movement, which spilled over into the diplomatic field. It was fortunate that the congregation moved in 1887 to the hall of the Lerber School (now the Freies Gymnasium) in Nageligasse.

The city authorities offered St Anthony's Chapel (the Antonierkirche in Postgasse, at the time being used as a fire brigade storehouse) to the Anglican church in 1889. The architect Reginald Blomfield (best remembered today as architect of the Menin Gate in Ypres) reported favourably on the opportunity. Despite the enthusiasm of the proprietor of the Hotel Bernerhof, and of Bishop Wilkinson, the offer failed for lack of financial support. Permission was given for services to be held in the cathedral (or, if service times clashed, in the French church), but the church did not act on this offer. Services continued to be held in the Lerberschule.

=== Construction ===
Bern began to expand on the other side of the River Aare, and in 1881, the English-Bern Land Company bought the area of Kirchenfeld, getting permission to develop it on condition that they build a bridge spanning the Aare to link it to the city centre. At their meeting on 14 June 1904, the Directors, "being very anxious to meet the wishes of the promoters of the Church", offered a central site in their development at Jubiläumsplatz on condition that money for funding a church be provided by the end of 1905.

An appeal fund had already been set up. However, by July 1904, only Fr 13318.50 of the hoped-for Fr 25000 had been raised. An intensive campaign was launched to raise the remainder, which was reckoned as the equivalent of £468, a considerable sum at the time. (Prospective donors were reminded that "the few resident English people pay for a clergyman which costs them £95 per annum, and cannot do more.")

A wealthy American episcopalian, Mrs John Castleman from St Louis, Missouri, came to Bern with her adopted daughter, who was to have an operation at the clinic of Dr Theodor Kocher. There she met the mother of the then Chaplain, Gilbert Sissons, who was having a similar operation. Both made near-miraculous recoveries, and as a thank offering, Mrs Castleman donated a large sum for the building of the church.

The application for building permission was published by the "English-American Church" in November 1905 and the land was transferred to the SPG on 16 January 1906. The church was designed to seat a hundred people. It was completed in only a few months, and was ready in the spring of 1906. The architects were Eduard Rybi and Ernst Salchli.

The church was consecrated on Thursday, 20 September 1906 by the Coadjutor Bishop for North and Central Europe, Edward Wilkinson, in the presence of Ludwig Forrer, the President of the Confederation, and of Sir George Bonham, the British Minister to Switzerland.

Maintaining the church represented a considerable expense for members of the congregation. Funds were also established for an "east" window, dedicated by Bishop Herbert Bury in memory of Cecil Bonham at the end of 1911. There was a bell fund, and a fence fund (for one of the conditions on which the land was given was the construction of a substantial fence, which was to cost Fr. 5000). A fund was also established to buy a permanent house for the chaplain. Richard Pring, writing in 1912, remarked that even when the new Lötschberg railway had been opened, and the Bellevue and Schweizerhof Hotels reopened, the chaplain's income was unlikely to exceed £130 or £150 a year, "and that, without a house, especially for a married man, is totally inadequate." He hoped that a house would soon be built, so that "Berne may no longer be looked upon as quite one of most underpaid chaplaincies on the Continent."

In 1914, the church received a grant of Fr 1752.30 from SPG, and 29 individual subscriptions added Fr 1690. Collections totalled Fr 3079.70. Out of this, the church had to fund the chaplain's stipend, which amounted to Fr 4432.50 (the equivalent then of £180). The remainder went to pay the cleaner, the gardener, and the expenses of running the church.

The chaplain at the time lived in the Pension Herter in Kramgasse. Although a Vicarage Fund existed (amounting in 1914 to Fr 435 (or £17)), successive chaplains found their own accommodation up until 1956 (latterly at Kirchenfeldstrasse 50, adjacent to the church). The Bell Fund and the Sanctuary Fund were regarded as more important. (The bell was cast in 1918 by the firm of Rüetschi in Aarau.)

=== The last 100 years ===
During the First World War, the church was sometimes filled to overflowing. However, in the interwar years, the congregation seldom exceeded 30, and consisted largely of Anglo-Swiss families, with a small representation from the diplomatic community. (A notable event was in 1922, when General Booth of the Salvation Army visited.) The permanent English-speaking population of Bern was relatively small between the wars.

As part of the Coronation celebrations in 1953, the church community had already started an ambitious campaign to raise Fr 120000 to build a hall and adjacent house for the chaplain. The city architectural department gave support and advice, but part of the plan involved the city's education department using the hall during the week. This was contrary to the covenants which the Bern Land Company had given the church's neighbours when the church was originally built, that the land would only be used for a church. After a public inquiry, the city withdrew its plans to use the hall, and permission was given. Preliminary building work was completed in 1956, but the final structure was only finished in January 1960.

After the evening service on Tuesday, 21 September 1976, an electric heater was left on. At 6.45 the next day, the organ burst into flames, and although the fire brigade was called promptly, the damage was considerable.

A change in tax legislation in 1991 made a windfall sum available for additional building work. As a result, the church hall was extended in 1992–4, and other church buildings were improved.

== Links ==
List of churches in Berne
