= Ken Letts =

Australian priest

Kenneth John Letts is an Australian retired priest in the Anglican Church of Australia. He was the Archdeacon of France from 2007 to 2012.

Letts was educated at the University of Melbourne, the University of Leeds and the College of the Resurrection, Mirfield, UK. He was ordained deacon in 1971 and priest in 1972. After a curacy at Mount Waverley in Melbourne, he was a chaplain at Melbourne Church of England Grammar School. After that, he was priest in charge at Albert Park in Melbourne from 1981 to 1994 and senior chaplain at St Michael's Grammar School, St Kilda. He was then appointed as rector of Holy Trinity, Nice and St Hugh's, Vence, France, in the Diocese in Europe.

In 1998, he was elected as a representative for France in the synod of the Diocese in Europe, and later appointed as the bishop's Oecumenical Officer for France and Monaco, as well as a member of the Anglican-Roman Catholic Commission for France. In the new millennium, he was appointed as a canon of Gibraltar Cathedral, co-president of the Anglican-Roman Catholic Commission for France, an official member of the Conseil des Églises Chrétiennes de France and Anglican observer to the French Bishops' Conference. He then became Acting Archdeacon of France, before being appointed as archdeacon and a member of the bishop's council. In 2013, the bishop named him as a canon emeritus of Gibraltar Cathedral.

Upon his return to Australia, France honoured him by awarding him the Order of Chevalier de l'Ordre National du Mérite for his pastoral and ecumenical work during his ministry there.
