= Jonathan Lloyd (priest) =

British-Canadian social worker and Anglican priest (born 1956)

Jonathan W LLoyd is a British-Canadian social worker and Anglican priest, born in Somerset, England in 1956.

In 1975/6 he worked with Bishop Trevor Huddleston CR and was deported from South Africa by the apartheid regime whilst on his way to work for the Anglican Diocese of Damaraland in Namibia. He then joined Bishop Colin Winter, Bishop of Namibia-in-Exile, as a refugee support worker and personal assistant. He also worked for the International Defence and Aid Fund for Southern Africa the anti-apartheid organisation founded by Canon L John Collins to support political prisoners and their families.

After a bachelor's and master's degree in the Social Sciences, in 1982 LLoyd qualified as a social worker from Goldsmiths - University of London. After posts in local authority mental health and family social work in Southwark and Newham, in 1986 he was appointed as a Principal Social Worker at St Christopher's Hospice specialising in psychosocial fields of palliative care and bereavement.

He completed theological training at the Southwark Ordination Course (now St Augustine's College of Theology) and was ordained Deacon in 1990 by Bishop Ronald Bowlby at Southwark Cathedral and Priest in 1991 by Bishop Peter Hall at St Paul Deptford. He served a curacy at St Bartholomew, Sydenham, was a Priest Vicar of Southwark Cathedral, Director of Social Responsibility and Bishop's Officer in the Diocese of Southwark until 1997.

In November 1993 LLoyd spent six weeks in Kwa-Zulu Natal, South Africa, as a monitor with the World Council of Churches' Ecumenical Monitoring Programme South Africa (EMPSA), and was based in the townships of Steadville and eZekani in the period of political violence before the 1994 national elections.

In 1997 he became University Chaplain for the University of Bath serving there until 2004. He was elected as Chair of the Conference of European University Chaplains in 1999 (until 2002).

In 2002, Jonathan LLoyd was appointed as a Non Executive Director of the Royal United Hospital Bath, serving in this role for seven years and chairing the Trust's Improving Working Lives Committee and being Complaints Convenor.

In 2004 he returned to parish ministry as Priest in Charge of Charlcombe with Bath St Stephen in the Diocese of Bath and Wells.

In 2009 he was appointed as Archdeacon of Germany and Northern Europe(the Anglican churches in Germany, the Nordics, and the Baltics) and Chaplain of St Alban Copenhagen (with Aarhus) in the Church of England Diocese in Europe. He was collated on 20 January 2010 by Bishop Geoffrey Rowell.

He was also a Canon (in the stall of St Henry of Finland) of Holy Trinity Pro-Cathedral, Brussels, and was appointed Canon Emeritus (Diocese in Europe) from 2014.

He returned to the UK in 2014, as Priest in Charge of the Bridge and Littlebourne Benefices in the Diocese of Canterbury, and then moved in 2016 to Vancouver, BC, Canada, to be Rector of St Stephen West Vancouver, in the Diocese of New Westminster of the Anglican Church of Canada. He was also Regional Dean of Sea to Sky and a member of the Diocesan Council and Synod.

Canon LLoyd retired from full-time ministry in 2021 and returned to England. He is currently (part-time) County Ecumenical Officer for Churches Together in Somerset.

He is a professed member of the Third Order of the Society of Saint Francis (TSSF).

Canon LLoyd has been elected to the General Synod of the Church of England (Proctor in Convocation) three times; from the Diocese of Southwark in 1995, the Diocese of Bath & Wells in 2006, and the Diocese in Europe in 2013. He is married with two adult children.
