= Edward Eliot (priest) =

Edward Francis Whately Eliot (15 April 1864 – 29 June 1943) was an Anglican Archdeacon in the Mediterranean.

Eliot was educated at Clifton, Haileybury, and Trinity College, Cambridge. He was ordained deacon in 1887 and priest in 1888. After curacies in Tufnell Park and Bournemouth he held incumbencies in Southampton, Eastbourne and Haywards Heath. He was Chaplain of St Michael, Beaulieu-sur-Mer from 1921 to 1934. After that he was Canon of Gibraltar and Archdeacon in Italy and the French Riviera until his death.
