= Martin Draper =

Former Archdeacon of France

Martin Paul Draper, OBE (born 1950) was Archdeacon of France from 1994 to 2002.

Draper was educated at Birmingham University and Chichester Theological College; and ordained deacon in 1975 and priest in 1976. After curacies in Primrose Hill and Westminster he served at St George, Paris. He was made an honorary canon of Gibraltar Cathedral in 2002. He was an honorary assistant priest at St James's, Sussex Gardens, London W2 until 2025 and has permission to officiate in the dioceses of London and Gibraltar in Europe.
