= Zeughausgasse =

Street in Bern, Switzerland

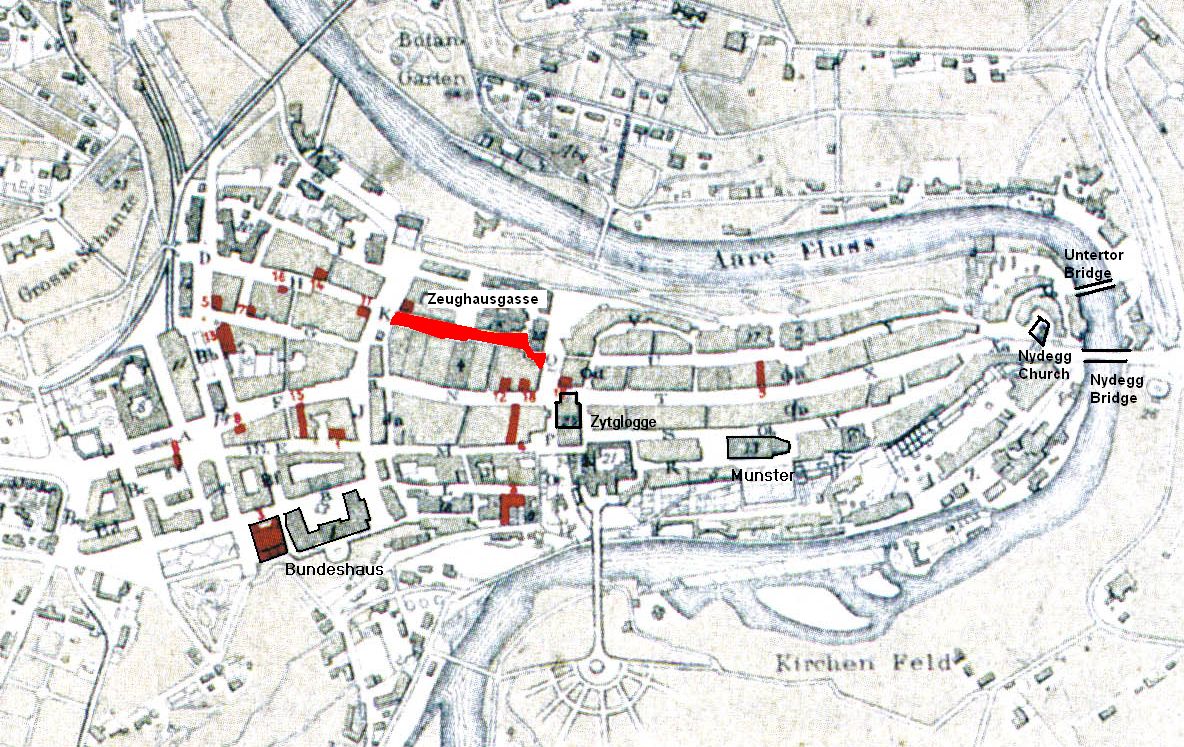
- Old City of Bern with Zeughausgasse highlighted
- Interactive map of Zeughausgasse
- Native name: Zeughausgasse (German)
- Length: 200 m (660 ft)
- Location: Old City of Bern, Bern, Switzerland
- Postal code: 3011
- Coordinates: 46.94889°N 7.44583°E

The Zeughausgasse (Armory lane) is one of the streets in the Old City of Bern, the medieval city center of Bern, Switzerland. It is part of the Innere Neustadt which was built during the second expansion in 1255 to 1260. The eastern end is at Kornhausplatz while the western end is at Waisenhausplatz. It is part of the UNESCO Cultural World Heritage Site that encompasses the Old City.

== History ==
Zeughausgasse was originally called vor den Predigern after the nearby Prediger Abbey. The Dominican abbey was built throughout the 13th and 14th centuries. In 1527 the abbey was secularized and the street changed names to Beim Totentanz after a Dance of Death painting cycle by Niklaus Manuels on the abbey wall. The 107.5 m (353 ft) long wall was painted with the fresco in 1520 which remained until the demolition of the wall in 1660. Even though the painting was destroyed in the 17th century, the street remained Beim Totentanz until the 18th century. In 1745 it was renamed Zeughausgasse and widened. The Zeughaus or armory, that the street was named after, had originally been a workhouse for the abbey and occupied what would become Zeughausgasse 18-28, Nägeligasse 4-6 and 7-13. In 1876 the old armory was demolished and in 1880 the street was widened.

== Sights ==
The former city council hall for the outer city (German: Ehemaliges Rathaus des Äusseren Standes) at Zeughausgasse 17 is a Swiss heritage site of national significance. Two other sites, the former Kornhaus (a type of granary) which is now a museum and the city theatre (German: Stadttheater), are at the end of Zeughausgasse but with a Kornhausplatz address.
