= Curates' Augmentation Fund =

The Curates' Augmentation Fund is an ecclesiastical charity set up in 1866 to provide extra income for those clergy in long term curacies, often in slum parishes or difficult terrain overseas.
