= Tomline =

Tomline is a surname. Notable people with the surname include:

- "Colonel" George Tomline (1813–1889), English politician
- George Pretyman Tomline FRS (1750–1827), Bishop of Lincoln and then Bishop of Winchester
- William Edward Tomline FRS (1787–1836), English politician and Member of Parliament
