= Thomas Quin =

Irish Anglican priest

Thomas Rothwell Quin, OBE (1915 – 1998) was an Anglican priest.

Quin was born in 1915, educated at Trinity College, Dublin, and ordained in 1939. After a curacy at Ballymacarrett he was a Chaplain in the RAF from 1941 to 1970. He was also an Honorary Chaplain to the Queen from 1967 to 1970 when he became Chaplain at St Andrew, Zürich. He was Archdeacon of Switzerland from 1970 to 1980.
