= Thomas Buckton =

Anglican Archdeacon

Thomas Frederick Buckton (1858 – 26 December 1933) was an Anglican Archdeacon in the Mediterranean from 1922 until his death.

Buckton was educated at Hull and East Riding College and Clare College, Cambridge and ordained in 1885. After a curacy in High Harrogate, he was Vicar of Horsforth then the Chaplain at Nice, France. He was Archdeacon in the Peninsula and North Africa from 1922 to 1929; and then of Gibraltar until his death in 1933.
