= Pat Curran (footballer, born 1917) =

English footballer

Personal information
- Full name: Patrick Joseph Curran
- Date of birth: 13 November 1917
- Place of birth: Sunderland, England
- Date of death: December 2003 (aged 86)
- Place of death: Sunderland, England
- Position: Inside forward

Youth career
- St Joseph's Boys
- Sunderland St Patrick

Senior career*
| Years | Team | Apps | (Gls) |
| 1936–1938 | Sunderland | 1 | (0) |
| 1938–1939 | Ipswich Town | 7 | (1) |
| 1939–1947 | Watford | 0 | (0) |
| 1947–1948 | Bradford City | 5 | (1) |
| Total | | 13 | (2) |
- * Club domestic league appearances and goals

Patrick Joseph Curran, known as Pat Curran or sometimes Joe Curran (13 November 1917 – December 2003) was an English professional footballer who played as an inside forward.

== Career ==
Born in Sunderland, Curran played for St Joseph's Boys, Sunderland St Patrick, Sunderland, Ipswich Town, Watford and Bradford City.

For Sunderland, he made 1 appearance in the Football League.

For Ipswich, he made 7 appearances in the Football League, scoring 1 goal; he also made 2 other first-team appearances.

He played for Bradford City between June 1947 and 1948. He made 5 appearances in the Football League for them, scoring 1 goal.

== Sources ==
- Frost, Terry (1988). Bradford City A Complete Record 1903-1988. Breedon Books Sport. ISBN 0-907969-38-0.
