= George Westwell =

George Leslie Cedric Westwell (1931-2001) was Archdeacon of Malta from 1985 to 1992.

Westwell was educated at Lichfield Theological College; and ordained in 1963. After curacies in Rothwell and Armley he held incumbencies at Otham and Maidstone.

He died on 22 June 2001.
