= John de Wit =

English Anglican priest (born 1947)

John de Wit (born 1947) is an Anglican priest who was Archdeacon of North West Europe from 2008 to 2012.

De Wit was educated at Oriel College, Oxford, and Westcott House, Cambridge. After a curacy at Christ Church, Quinton he was team vicar of Solihull. He then served at Kings Heath, Hampton in Arden and Utrecht.
