= Arthur Siddall =

Arthur Siddall (born 1943) is a retired Anglican priest.

Siddall was educated at Lancaster University and ordained in 1968. He was a curate at Holy Trinity Formby and All Saints' Childwall before five years as a Church Mission Society missionary in Bangladesh. On his return to England he held incumbencies at St Paul's Clitheroe and St Gabriel's Blackburn. He was Deputy Secretary to The Mission to Seafarers from 1990 to 1993 and then Vicar of St Bartholomew's, Chipping, before his appointment as Archdeacon of Italy and Malta in 2005. In 2007 he additionally became Archdeacon of Switzerland. He retired in 2009.
