= Patrick Curran (priest) =

English archdeacon (born 1956)

Patrick Curran (born 1956) was Archdeacon of the Eastern Archdeaconry from 2001 to 2015.

Curran was educated at the University of King's College, the University of Southampton and ordained after a period of study at Chichester Theological College in 1985. He has served the Anglican Church in Heavitree, Bradford, Bonn, Vienna and Valletta.
