= Frederick Bailey (priest) =

Frederick James Bailey MVO (1889 – 30 March 1965) was Archdeacon of Malta from 1948 to 1964.

Bailey was educated at Dorchester Missionary College; and ordained in 1923. After curacies in Andros and Nassau he was Priest in charge at St George's Church, Tombland, Norwich, then Vicar of St Simon and St Jude's Church, Norwich. He was Chaplain to the Embassy of the United Kingdom, Madrid and then served the Anglican Church overseas in Florence Italy, Montana, Switzerland and Sliema, Malta.

Bailey died in Italy on 30 March 1965.
