= George Church (priest) =

Former Archdeacon of Malta

George Harold Christian Church CBE (11 January 1911 – ) was an English priest who was Archdeacon of Malta from 1971 to 1975.

Church was born in Burrough Green, Cambridgeshire, to Rev. Edward Joseph Church and Florence Edith Badger. He was educated at the London College of Divinity; and ordained in 1938. After a curacy in Ware a he was an RAF Chaplain from 1939 to 1965.
