= Bill Edebohls =

Australian priest

William Ernest Edebohls is an Australian priest. He was formerly an Anglican priest who subsequently became a Roman Catholic.

Edebohls was formerly the Dean of Ballarat from 1987 to 1996 and the Archdeacon of Italy and Malta. He is currently the parish priest at St Pius X in Heidelberg West, Melbourne.
