= David Sutch (priest) =

David Sutch (born 27 August 1947) was Archdeacon of Gibraltar from 2008 until 2013.

Sutch was educated at King's College London and ordained in 1971. After a curacy at Hartcliffe he held incumbencies in Dorcan, Alveston, Yate and Cainscross. From 2007 to 2013 he was Chaplain on the Costa del Sol. He was also with the Royal Army Chaplains Department from 1980 to 2003.
