= All Saints' Church, Rome =

All Saints' Church
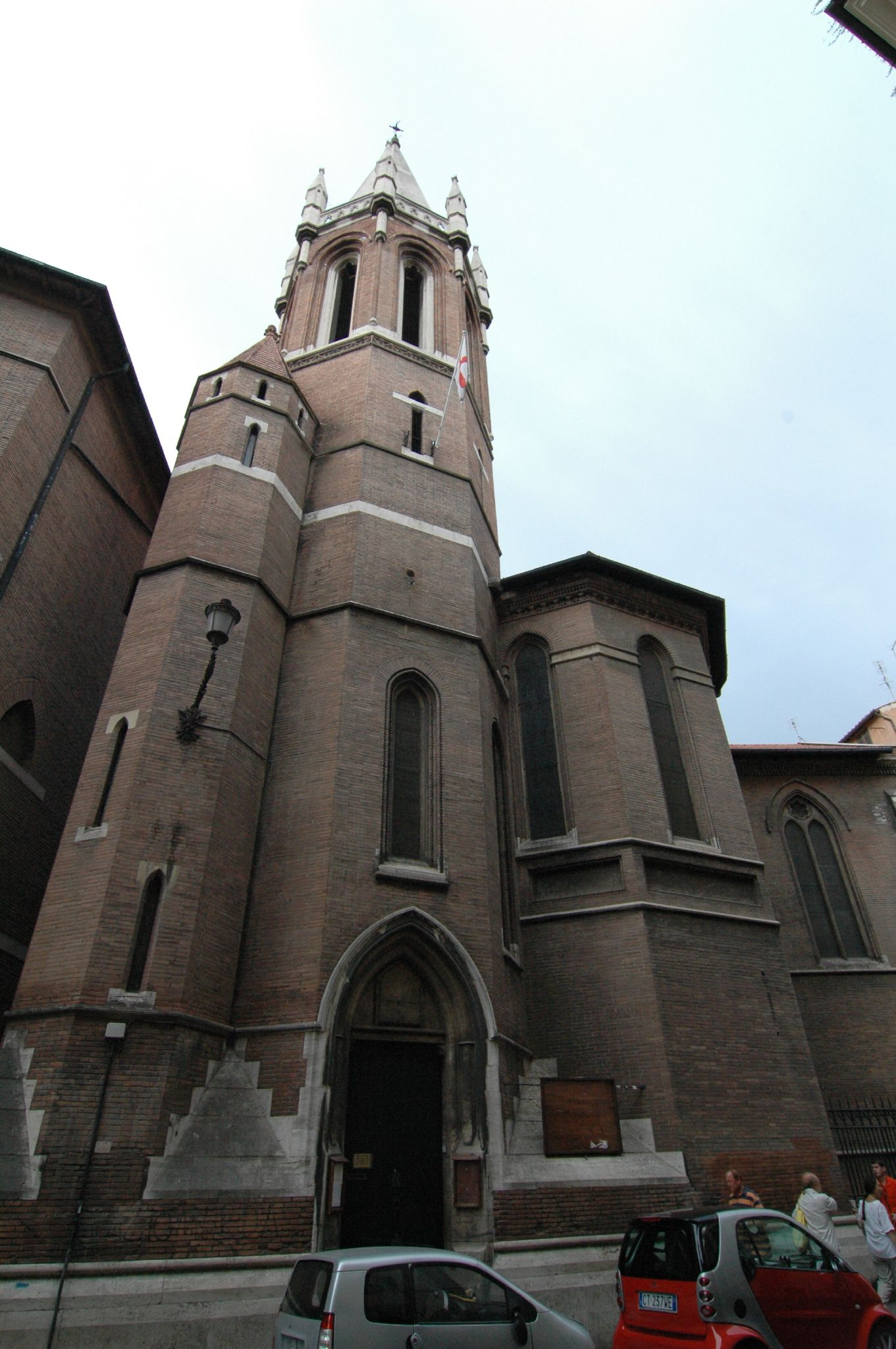
- Facade
- Click on the map for a fullscreen view
- 41°54′30″N 12°28′44″E
- Location: Via del Babuino, Rome
- Country: Italy
- Denomination: Anglican
- Churchmanship: High Church
- Website: https://www.allsaintsrome.org/

Architecture
- Style: Gothic revival

Specifications
- Materials: red-brick

Administration
- Diocese: Diocese in Europe

Clergy
- Bishop: Robert Innes
- Vicar: Fr. Robert Warren

All Saints' Church is an active English-speaking Anglican chaplaincy of the Church of England's Diocese in Europe in Rome, Italy.

The church building is a Gothic revival red-brick construction, situated in the Via del Babuino, about 100 meters from the Spanish Steps. The architect was George Edmund Street (1824–1881). It has a regular weekly schedule of masses and prayer services and is also used for concerts. All Saints follows the high church tradition of Anglicanism, with a sung Eucharist being held weekly.

== History ==
Anglican worship in Rome can trace its history back to the eighteenth century, when young British travellers took Grand Tours. Although some would bring Prayer Books, bibles and occasionally even chaplains, there remained demand for an English-language, Anglican service in Rome. Records exist of Anglican worship in the Palazzo Balestra as early as 1719, however, it was not until the nineteenth century that a permanent Anglican community was established.

In the area near the Spanish Steps known as the "English Ghetto", worship began in 1816. On 29 December that year, the service raised funds that were distributed to the poor, commencing a tradition of charity that continues today. In 1825, an anonymous donation allows for the foundation of the Granary Chapel in the Porta del Popolo, which gained a permanent chaplain in 1828 and fell under the jurisdiction of the Diocese of Gibraltar in 1842. Despite local unrest and changes in location, the chapel continued to expand into the 1870s.

The 1870s marked a schism in the Anglican community at Rome. Those who considered the clergy at the Granary Chapel too ritualistic separated and established a new church, Holy Trinity, which saw various iterations of building and location. However, this church closed in 1937, and the building was demolished in 1948.

The remaining community commenced planning for a new building when the Municipality of Rome announced the need to demolish the Granary Chapel for street widening. Victorian Gothic Revival architect G. E. Street began preparing plans in 1876, with the foundation stone being laid in 1882. Despite delays and a lack of funds (the incumbent Canon Wasse had to cover remaining construction expenses), the church was considered completed by 1887.

G. E. Street's design for the Anglican Church at Rome

Throughout the early twentieth century, various internal improvements were made and electricity was installed. In 1937, after an anonymous donation, the steeple which now pierces the Roman skyline was completed. The church closed during the Second World War, reopening on 9 June 1944. During the latter half of that century, the church saw many distinguished visitors, including the Princesses Elizabeth and Margaret, and Archbishops of Canterbury Ramsey and Fisher. In February 2017, Pope Francis visited All Saints’, the first visit of its kind by a sitting pope.

== Architecture ==
The church is the last work of Victorian architect George Edmund Street, and follows his usual ‘High Victorian’ gothic style. Influenced by both Italian architecture and the prevailing gothic style in England at the time, the building features a polychromatic design of red brick, pale Italian marble and pink Arles stone. During excavations before construction of the current church, remains of an imperial domus senatoria were discovered.

The church has a typical design of a central nave flanked by two aisles, gothic pointed arches and flying buttresses, surmounted by a wooden roof. The steeple, famous for appearances on the Roman skyline and in many films, was not completed until 1937, about fifty years after the main church took shape.

Interior

In the central nave, the columns and pillars are polychromed with marbles from across Southern Europe: green Carrara, red Perugia, black Verona and Yellow Siena. There are mosaics roundels of evangelists and other scriptural themes designed by Edward Burne-Jones.

The stained glass was designed by Clayton and Bell of London. In the chancel are scenes of the life of Christ, in the Lady Chapel the arcangels, in the nave, various English and Italian saints. At the counter-façade the window depicts the ascenscin of Christ, and by the rear door, Saints Peter and Paul.

The Lady Chapel is in the north aisle and features an English use altar. It is also the location of the aumbry, signified by the sacrament lamp. Also in the chapel is a copy of a Benedetto da Maiano Madonna and child.

The sanctuary contains the high altar, behind which is the marble reredos. The apse was decorated with red damask, which was replaced in 2001. The church uses vestments and altar frontals following the liturgical colours outlined by Percy Dearmer.

The pulpit is in yellow Siena and black Verona marble with white Como highlights, dedicated to the memory of Canon Wasse. The chancel-screen follows a similar colour pattern. There is a baptismal font, also of marble, with iconography of Christ about it.

== List of Chaplains ==
Granary Chapel

1828 - Richard Burgess
1837 - James Hutchinson
1850 - Francis Blake Woodward
1866 - John Crowder
1869 - Arthur Thomas Whitmore Shadwell
1873 - Joseph Brett Grant
1874 - Thomas Childe Barker
1875 - Henry Watson Wasse

All Saints' Church

1887 - Henry Watson Wasse
1891 - Frank Nutcombe Oxenham
1910 - John Gardner Brown
1916 - Gilbert Holme Sissons
1920 - Bernard Edgar Holmes
1924 - Lonsdale Ragg
1930 - William Thomas Farmiloe
1934 - Joshua Goodland
1935 - Hugh Aldersey Tudor
1936 - Ariel Law Harkness
1947 - Clifford Stickney Powers
1949 - John Findlow
1956 - Douglas James Noel Wanstall
1971 - David Davies
1974 - Edward Murfet
1977 - David Henry Palmer
1983 - Bevan Wardrobe
1992 - Peter Merchant
1994 - Geoffrey Evans
1999 - Jonathan Thomas Boardman
2019 - Robert James Warren

== Gallery ==
Pope Francis visiting All Saints' in 2017.

Princess Margaret leaving the church during the 1950s.

The interior of All Saints' during the 1990s.

The High Altar on Easter Sunday, 1925.

The Porta del Popolo in Rome, showing the Granary Chapel on the right, circa 1860s.

== See also ==
- St Andrew's Church, Rome (Church of Scotland)
- St Paul's Within the Walls, Rome (Episcopal, also by G. E. Street)
