= Dean of Gibraltar =

Church of England senior clergy member

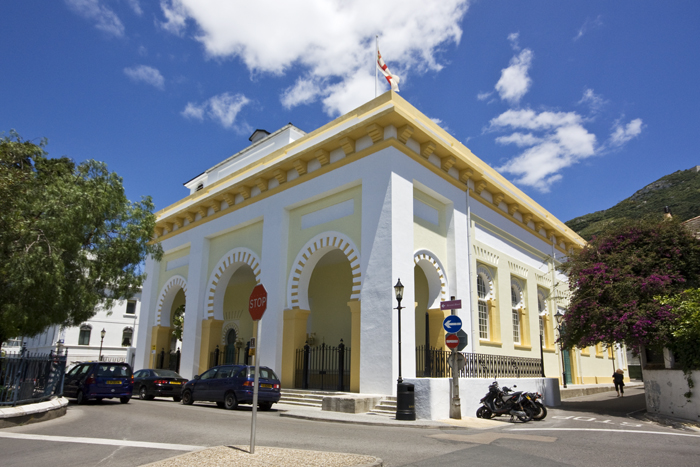
Gibraltar Cathedral

The Dean of Gibraltar is the head (primus inter pares – first among equals) and chair of the chapter of canons, the ruling body of the Cathedral of the Holy Trinity, Gibraltar. The cathedral is the mother church of the Diocese in Europe and the seat of the Bishop in Europe (though the bishop is now based in Brussels). As of 2020, the current dean is Ian Tarrant.

== List of deans ==
- 1905–1912 Decimus Govett
- 1913–1920 William Hayter
- 1921–1927 James Cropper
- 1928–1933 Geoffrey Warde
- 1933–1941 Walter Knight-Adkin
- 1941–1943 James Johnston (Acting)
- 1943–1945 William Ashley-Brown
- 1945–1950 Stephen Nason
- 1950–1960 Henry Lloyd
- 1960–1968 Godfrey Worsley
- 1968–1973 Ken Giggall
- 1973–1978 Ambrose Weekes
- 1978–1983 Robert Pope
- 1983–1985 John Rowlands
- 1986–1988 Anthony Nind
- 1989–1997 Brian Horlock
- 1997–2000 Gordon Reid
- 2000–2003 Kenneth Robinson
- 2003–2008 Alan Woods
- 2008 – November 2017 John Paddock
- 2017–2020: Robin Gill (acting dean)
- 13 October 2020 – present: Ian Tarrant (2 April installation postponed; licensed as "Bishop's Commissary in Gibraltar" ad interim)
