= Ian Tarrant =

Anglican priest

The Very Reverend Ian Tarrant
- Dean of Gibraltar
- Diocese: Diocese in Europe
- In office: 16 March 2020

Orders
- Ordination: 1984 (deacon); 1985 (priest)

Personal details
- Born: 1957 (age 68–69)
- Spouse: Sally Barton
- Education: Gonville and Caius College, Cambridge

Ian Tarrant (born Essex 1957) is an Anglican priest, the Dean of Gibraltar since 2020.

Tarrant was educated at Gonville and Caius College, Cambridge and at St John's College, Nottingham. He was ordained deacon in 1984 and priest in 1985.

After a curacy in Ealing he worked in the Democratic Republic of the Congo from 1988 to 1998. He was Senior Anglican Chaplain at the University of Nottingham from 1998 to 2009 and Rector of Woodford from then until his appointment as Dean. His wife, Sally Barton, holds the world record for being the oldest person to play international cricket.

Church of England titles
Preceded by Robin Gill acting	Dean of Gibraltar; 2020 –	Incumbent
