= Ambrose Weekes =

Anglo-Catholic bishop

The Right Reverend Ambrose Weekes CB FKC
- Suffragan Bishop in Europe and vicar-general
- Diocese: Diocese in Europe
- In office: 1980–1986
- Predecessor: Himself (as Assistant Bishop)
- Other posts: Chaplain of the Fleet (1969–1972); Dean of Gibraltar (1973–1977); Assistant Bishop and vicar-general (Gibraltar & Fulham, 1977–1980)

Orders
- Ordination: 1942 (deacon); 1943 (priest) by Christopher Chavasse
- Consecration: 1977 by Gerald Ellison

Personal details
- Born: 25 April 1919
- Died: 24 April 2012 (aged 92) Smithfield, City of London, United Kingdom
- Denomination: Anglo-Catholic
- Parents: William & Ethel
- Education: King's College, London

Ambrose Walter Marcus Weekes CB FKC (25 April 1919 – 24 April 2012) was an Anglo-Catholic bishop in the 20th century who served as the first Suffragan Bishop in Europe.

== Family and education ==
Weekes was the son of William, a naval officer, and Ethel, a justice of the peace. He was educated at Rochester Cathedral Choir School, Sir Joseph Williamson's School, Rochester and King's College, London, where he gained his Associate of King's College (AKC) in theology in 1941 – he was later elected a Fellow of King's College (FKC) in 1972. He trained for the ministry at King's and at Lincoln Theological College.

== Naval chaplain ==
He was ordained a deacon on Trinity Sunday (31 May) 1942 and a priest on Trinity Sunday (20 June) 1943 (both times by Christopher Chavasse, Bishop of Rochester, in Rochester Cathedral), serving his title as assistant curate of St Luke's, Gillingham, Kent. He then became a wartime chaplain with the RNVR (1944–1946) then served as a Royal Navy chaplain (1944–1969). He became Chaplain of the Fleet, with the title of Archdeacon of the Royal Navy, and an Honorary Chaplain to the Queen (QHC, all 1969–1972), also being made a Companion of the Bath (CB) in 1970 and a canon of Gibraltar Cathedral in 1971.

== Europe ==
Moving to the Diocese of Gibraltar, Weekes served Tangier as their chaplain from 1972 until he was appointed Dean of Gibraltar (1973–1978). On St James's day (25 July) 1977, he was consecrated a bishop (by Gerald Ellison, Bishop of London, in the chapel of the Royal Naval College, Greenwich), to serve as full-time Auxiliary/Assistant Bishop in Gibraltar diocese until the diocese was reformed into the Diocese in Europe in 1980, at which point he became the first Suffragan Bishop in Europe. He was based in Brussels as Dean of the Pro-Cathedral and retired from both posts in 1986. He was also Vicar General of the diocese.

== Retirement ==
In retirement, he became an honorary assistant bishop of the Diocese of Rochester and an honorary canon of Rochester Cathedral (1986–1988) before again serving in Europe as an honorary assistant bishop (from 1988) and chaplain of Montreux and Gstaad (1988–1992). He became a Freeman of the City of London in 2000 and held permission to officiate (PtO) from 2003. He died, aged 92, at the London Charterhouse, where he was a resident.

Military offices
Preceded by Christopher Prior	Chaplain of the Fleet; 1970–1973	Succeeded by Chandos Morgan
Church of England titles
Preceded by Ken Giggall	Dean of Gibraltar; 1973–1978	Succeeded by Robert Pope
Preceded by Harold Isherwood	Assistant Bishop (Gibraltar and Fulham) and vicar-general 1978–1980	Succeeded by Himself as Suffragan Bishop in Europe
Preceded by Himself as Assistant Bishop (Gibraltar and Fulham)	Suffragan Bishop in Europe; 1980–1986	Succeeded by Edward Holland
