= Robert Innes (bishop) =

British Anglican bishop (born 1959)

The Right Reverend Dr Robert Innes
- Bishop in Europe
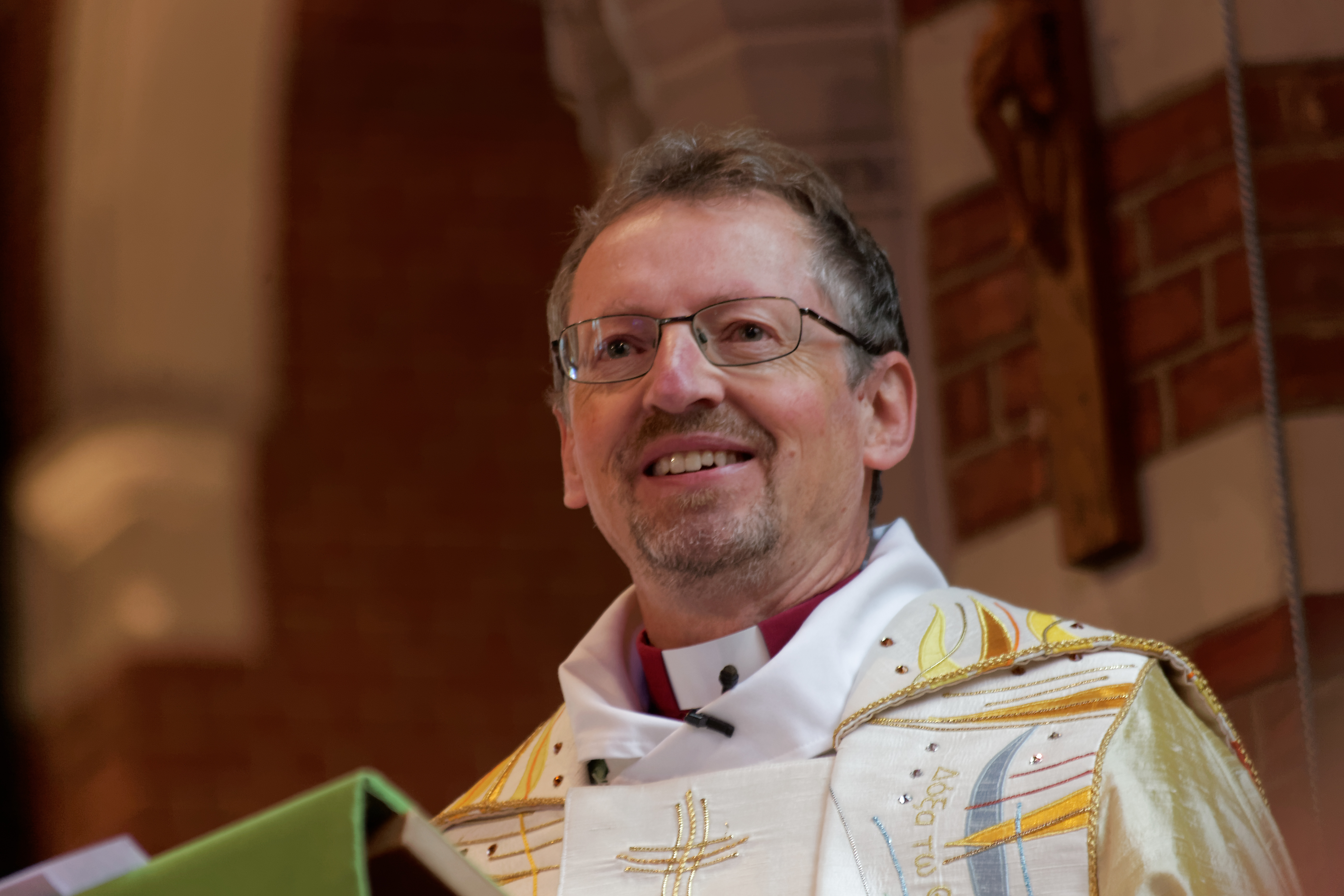
- Church: Church of England
- Diocese: Diocese in Europe
- In office: 2014–present
- Predecessor: Geoffrey Rowell
- Other posts: Senior Chaplain and Chancellor of Holy Trinity, Brussels (2005–2014); Chaplain to the Queen (2012–2014)

Orders
- Ordination: 1995 (deacon); 1996 (priest) by Michael Turnbull
- Consecration: 20 July 2014 by Justin Welby

Personal details
- Born: Robert Neil Innes; 1959 (age 66–67) Wolverhampton, Staffordshire, United Kingdom
- Denomination: Anglican
- Residence: Waterloo, Belgium
- Spouse: Helen Innes (m. 1985)
- Children: 4
- Profession: Bishop
- Education: King's College, Cambridge

Robert Neil Innes (born 11 October 1959) is an Anglican bishop. Since 2014, he has been the bishop in Europe. Prior to becoming bishop he was chancellor and senior chaplain of the Pro-Cathedral of the Holy Trinity, Brussels.

== Early life and education ==
Innes was born in Wolverhampton. He lived in the Netherlands briefly before moving to Woking, Surrey. He was educated at the Royal Grammar School, Guildford, and studied engineering at King's College, Cambridge, gaining his Bachelor of Arts (BA) degree in 1982. He worked in the electric power industry, then Arthur Andersen Management Consultants (now Accenture) until 1989 when he went to train for the priesthood at Cranmer Hall, Durham, whence he gained a further BA (in Theology) in 1991 and his doctorate (Doctor of Philosophy, PhD) from Durham University in 1995. His doctoral thesis was titled "Strategies for securing the unity of the self in Augustine and certain modern psychologists".

== Ordained ministry ==
Following the conclusion of his doctoral studies, Innes was made a deacon at Petertide on 2 July 1995, by Michael Turnbull, Bishop of Durham, at Durham Cathedral. He was ordained a priest the next year. He became a lecturer in systematic theology at St John's College, Durham (of which Cranmer Hall is a part), while serving two titles/curacies. He was ordained to the title of St Cuthbert's Church, Durham and then served a curacy at Sherburn, Pittington and Shadforth from 1997. In 1999 he was appointed as vicar of St Mary Magdalene Church in Belmont.

Innes moved to Brussels in 2005 to become chancellor and senior chaplain of Pro-Cathedral of the Holy Trinity, Brussels. He was an assistant diocesan director of ordinands from 2007. He was made president of the Central Committee for the Anglican Church in Belgium in 2009 and became president of the ecumenical Belgian Consultation of Christian Churches in 2012. He was appointed a chaplain to the late Queen Elizabeth II (an honorary post) in 2012.

He chaired the board of Grove Books Limited from 2000 and convened the Grove Ethical Studies Editorial Group from 1999 to 2007.

== Episcopal ministry ==
Innes was appointed Bishop in Europe in 2014; he was consecrated as a bishop on 20 July 2014 at Canterbury Cathedral by Justin Welby, Archbishop of Canterbury (with co-consecrators Richard Chartres, Bishop of London and Tim Dakin, Bishop of Winchester) and installed at Gibraltar Cathedral on 4 September 2014. He was subsequently installed in the Pro-Cathedrals of Malta and of Brussels. His office is in Brussels.

Innes was appointed chair of the Church of England's Faith and Order Commission in 2022. In that capacity, he is also a member of the House of Bishops' Standing Committee. He represents the Archbishop of Canterbury with the European Institutions. He is the co-chair of the Reuilly Ecumenical Conversations between the Church of England and the French Protestant Church. He is also a member of the Clergy Discipline Commission.

In 2024, he was appointed the Anglican co-chair of the International Anglican Roman Catholic Commission on Unity and Mission (IARRCUM).

Since 2018, he has been the president of the council of St John's College, Durham.

== Views ==
Innes condemned the Russian invasion of Ukraine and has persistently urged all Christians to unite in prayers for peace.

He is a supporter of the European project and spoke and wrote widely regarding his concerns about Brexit and its effects on Europe as a whole and on UK Nationals living in the Diocese in Europe. He is concerned for the unity of the worldwide church in a fragmented and conflictual world.

He abstained during a vote on introducing "standalone services for same-sex couples" on a trial basis during a meeting of the General Synod in November 2023; the motion passed.

== Personal life ==
Innes married in 1985 and has four children. He enjoys walking and trekking.

== Styles ==
- The Reverend Doctor Robert Innes (1995–2005)
- The Reverend Canon Doctor Robert Innes (2005–2014)
- The Right Reverend Doctor Robert Innes (2014–present)

== Publications ==
- Clergy in a Complex Age: Responses to the Guildelines for the Professional Conduct of the Clergy, Ed. with Jamie Harrison (2016)
- 'The Anglican Tradition and the Belgian Government' in de Pooter, ed. (2012)
- 'Augustine and the Journey to Wholeness' Journal of Augustinian Studies and Grove Books (2004)
- 'Rebuilding Trust in Healthcare' Ed with Jamie Harrison and Tim Van Zwanenberg (2003)
- 'Discourses of the Self' (1999)
- 'The New GP: Changing roles and the modern NHS' Ed. with Jamie Harrison and Tim Van Zwanenberg (1997)
- 'Personality Indicators and the Spiritual Life' Grove (1996)
- 'God at Work', Grove (1994)
- 'Responding to the Ukraine-Russia War,' Grove (2023)
