= William Hayter =

William Hayter may refer to:

- Sir William Hayter, 1st Baronet (1792–1878), British Whig politician
- William Hayter (priest) (1858–1935), British dean and teacher
- William Hayter (diplomat) (1906–1995), British diplomat, ambassador to the Soviet Union
