= Gibraltar women's national cricket team =

Gibraltar
- Flag of Gibraltar
- Association: Gibraltar Cricket Association

Personnel
- Captain: Amy Benatar

International Cricket Council
- ICC status: Associate member (1969)
- ICC region: Europe
ICC Rankings	Current	Best-ever
T20I	44th	44th (25 Aug 2025)

T20 Internationals
- First T20I: v Estonia at Europa Sports Park, Gibraltar; 20 April 2024
- Last T20I: v Estonia at Estonian National Cricket and Rugby Field 2, Tallinn; 3 August 2025
T20Is	Played	Won/Lost
Total	16	10/6 (0 ties, 0 no results)
This year	0	0/0 (0 ties, 0 no results)
- As of 3 August 2025

The Gibraltar women's national cricket team represents the British overseas territory of Gibraltar in women's international cricket. They have been an associate member of the International Cricket Council (ICC) since 1969.

== History ==
In April 2018, the ICC granted full Twenty20 International (T20I) status to all of its members. Therefore, all Twenty20 (T20) matches played between Gibraltar and other ICC members since 1 July 2018 have the full T20I status.

Gibraltar played their first Women's Twenty20 International (WT20I) during a three-match home series against Estonia on 20 April 2024, winning by 100 runs. The following day the sides met for two more games at Europa Sports Park with Gibraltar emerging victorious by 128 runs in the first match and 88 runs in the second to complete a 3–0 sweep. During match two of the series, captain and opening batter, Amy Benatar, registered the first WT20I half-century by a Gibraltar player scoring 68 not out off 74 balls. That match was also notable as it featured Sally Barton whose appearance as Gibraltar's wicketkeeper made her the oldest person to play international cricket aged 66 years and 334 days.

In June 2024, the team won the Women's Central Europe Cup at the Vinoř Cricket Ground in Prague, Czech Republic, winning three of their four matches to take the title on net run-rate ahead of Croatia with the hosts Czech Republic in third.

== Records and statistics ==
International Match Summary — Gibraltar Women

Last updated 3 August 2025

Playing Record
Format	M	W	L	T	NR	Inaugural Match
Twenty20 Internationals	16	10	6	0	0	20 April 2024

=== Twenty20 International ===
- Highest team total: 200/5 v Czech Republic on 16 June 2024 at Vinoř Cricket Ground, Prague, Czech Republic.
- Highest individual score: 70*, Amy Benatar v Czech Republic on 11 June 2025 at Vinoř Cricket Ground, Prague, Czech Republic.
- Best individual bowling figures: 4/6, Elizabeth Ferrary v Estonia on 21 April 2024 at Europa Sports Park, Gibraltar.

T20I record versus other nations

Records complete to WT20I #2432. Last updated 3 August 2025.

Opponent	M	W	L	T	NR	First match	First win
ICC Associate members
Austria	2	0	2	0	0	11 June 2025	
Croatia	2	1	1	0	0	15 June 2024	16 June 2024
Czech Republic	4	4	0	0	0	14 June 2024	14 June 2024
Estonia	6	5	1	0	0	20 April 2024	20 April 2024
Jersey	2	0	2	0	0	15 December 2024	

== See also ==
- List of Gibraltar women Twenty20 International cricketers
