= Sally Barton =

English/Gibraltar cricketer (born 1957)

Personal information
- Born: 23 May 1957 (age 69); London, England
- Batting: Right-handed
- Role: Wicket-keeper

International information
- National side: Gibraltar (2024)
- T20I debut (cap 12): 21 April 2024 v Estonia
- Last T20I: 3 August 2025 v Estonia

Career statistics
Competition	WT20I
Matches	13
Runs scored	6
Batting average	6.00
100s/50s	–/–
Top score	4
Catches/stumpings	1/1
- Source: Cricinfo, 4 August 2025

Sally Barton (born 23 May 1957) is an English-born cricketer who plays as a wicket-keeper for the Gibraltar women's national cricket team. She holds the world record for being the oldest person to play international cricket.

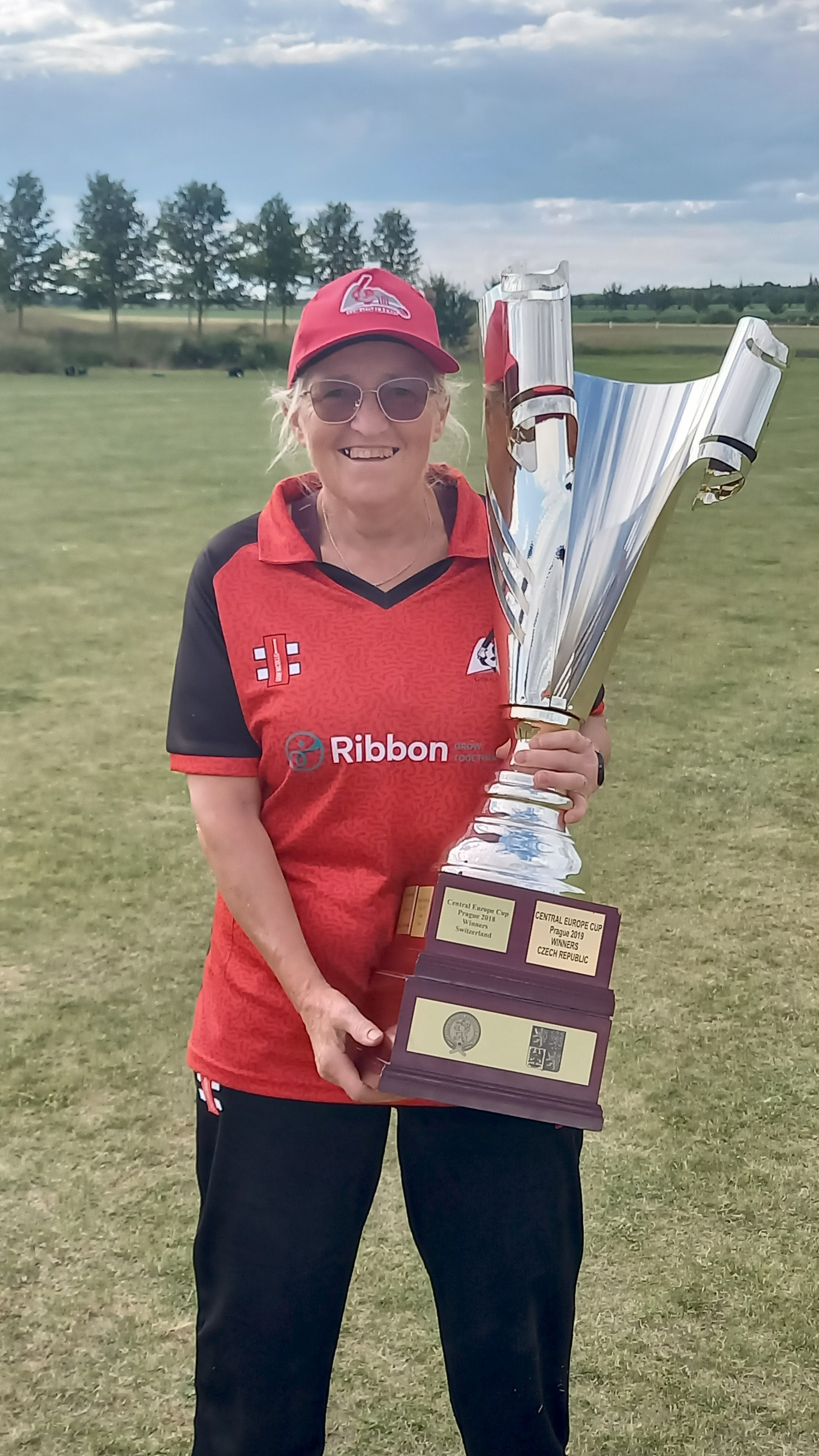
Sally Barton with Central European Cup 2024

== Biography ==
Born in London and raised in Ilford, Barton credits her parents - from Yorkshire and Lancashire - and her twin brother for fostering an early interest in cricket.

While at school she represented Essex in junior cricket and Kent Invicta ladies. She also played as wicket-keeper for the University of Nottingham men's 3rd XI during her student days.

Barton's cricketing exploits were put on hold when she spent 10 years working as a Christian missionary in the Democratic Republic of Congo in the 1990s before returning to England.

While teaching at the London School of Economics, she resumed playing cricket, turning out for the Heronettes in Wanstead.

Barton moved to Gibraltar in 2020 after her husband, Ian Tarrant, an Anglican priest, was appointed Dean of Gibraltar and she began playing regularly in the men's domestic league on the British Overseas Territory. Having fulfilled the eligibility criteria to represent Gibraltar, she participated in a T10 series taking two catches.

On 21 April 2024, Barton became the oldest international cricketer - male or female - when she made her WT20I debut for Gibraltar against Estonia at the age of 66 years and 334 days, eclipsing the previous record held by Portugal's Akbar Saiyad who was aged 66 years and 12 days when he played a T20 against Finland in 2012.

She also surpassed the all-time record for the oldest WT20I debutant, set by Guernsey player Philippa Stahelin, who made her first appearance against Jersey in 2019 when she was 58 years and 33 days old.

In the record-breaking game, Barton played as wicket-keeper but was not involved in any dismissals, nor did she bat, as her team won the second of a three-match series at Europa Sports Park in Gibraltar by 128 runs.

Having passed her 67th birthday a few weeks earlier, Barton was selected in the 12-player Gibraltar squad for the Women's Central Europe Cup to be held in the Czech Republic from 14 to 16 June 2024. She played in all four of her side's matches at the Vinoř Cricket Ground in Prague as Gibraltar won the event which also featured the Czech Republic and Croatia. Barton did not bat or take a catch or stumping but was involved in effecting a run-out in the final game against the Czechs.

Barton further extended her record when she played in the Gibraltar women's tour against Estonia in August 2025. She finally got to bat scoring four runs and took a catch, made a stumping and assisted in a run out.
