= Harold Isherwood =

Harold Isherwood may refer to:

- Harry Isherwood, English footballer
- Harold Isherwood (bishop) (1907–1989), Anglican bishop
