= Stephen Nason =

English Anglican priest (1901–1975)

- Vicar

Orders
- Ordination: 1927

Personal details
- Born: 30 March 1901 Cambridge, England
- Died: 13 March 1975 (aged 73)
- Denomination: Anglican
- Education: Pembroke College

George Stephen Nason was an Anglican priest. He was born on 30 March 1901 and educated at Shrewsbury School and Pembroke College, Cambridge. Ordained in 1927, he was a Curate at St Luke’s Battersea followed by a period as Rector of Bamford. He then served his country during World War II as a Chaplain in the RNVR after which he was Dean of Gibraltar. Returning to England in 1950, he became Vicar of St Alphege's Church in Greenwich, Rural Dean of Greenwich and Deptford, following which he was Vicar of St Peter and St Paul, Hambledon, Hampshire. He died on 13 March 1975.

== Notes ==
Church of England titles
Preceded by William Ashley-Brown	Dean of Gibraltar; 1945 – 1950	Succeeded by Henry Morgan Lloyd
