= Walter Knight-Adkin =

English Anglican priest

The Venerable Walter Knight-Adkin CB OBE QHC DL
- Archdeacon of the Royal Navy
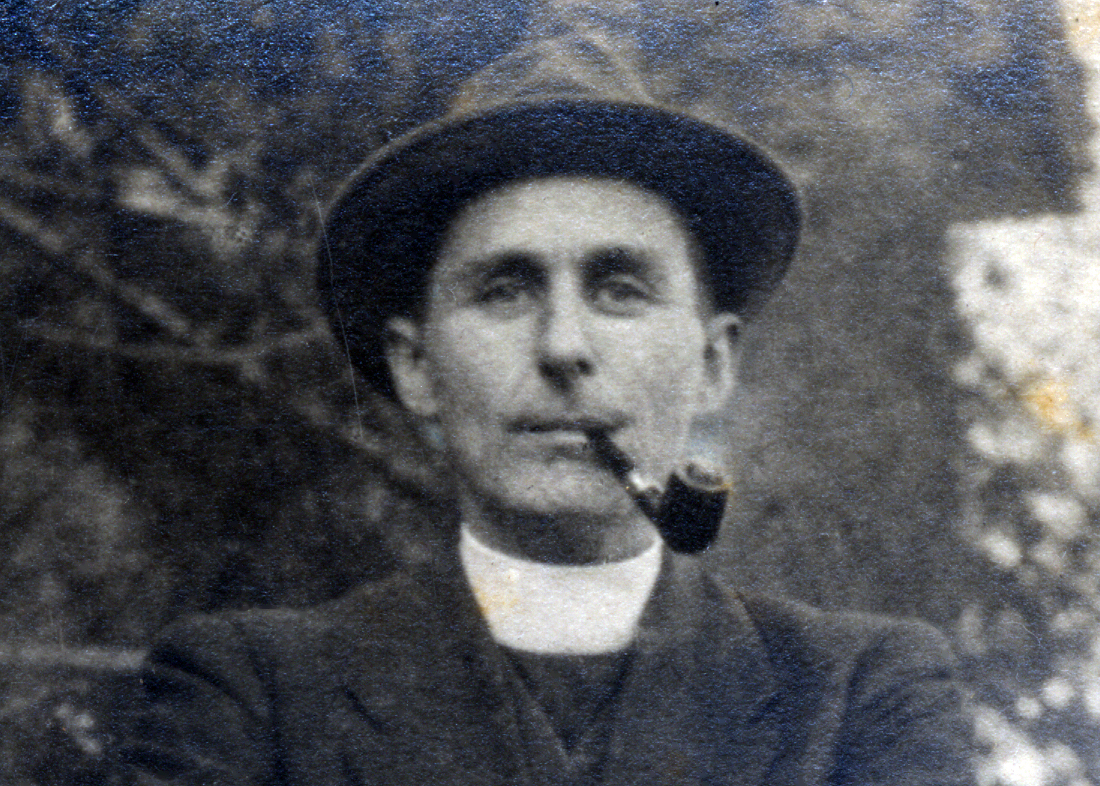
- Appointed: Chaplain of the Fleet; Honorary Chaplain to the King; Dean of Gibraltar
- In office: 1929–1933; 1929–1933; 1933–1941

Orders
- Ordination: June 1908, St Paul's Cathedral, London

Personal details
- Born: 17 August 1880 Cheltenham, Gloucestershire, England
- Died: 24 May 1957 (aged 67) Bristol, Gloucestershire, England
- Denomination: Church of England
- Parents: Rev Harry Kenrick Adkin (1851–1927); Georgina Elizabeth Knight (1849–1930)
- Spouse: Elizabeth Cuff Napier (1891–1984)
- Children: Peter Napier Knight-Adkin (1917–1918)
- Occupation: Naval chaplain
- Education: Cheltenham College
- Alma mater: St Edmund Hall, Oxford; Wells Theological College

Walter Kenrick Knight-Adkin CB OBE DL (17 August 1880 – 24 May 1957) was an Anglican priest in the first half of the 20th century.

== Ecclesiastical career ==
Born in Cheltenham, Knight-Adkin was educated at Cheltenham College and St Edmund Hall, Oxford. He did his pastoral training at Wells Theological College. Ordained in June 1908 at St Paul's Cathedral in London, he was a Curate at Kentish Town before commencing a long period of service on 31 April 1910 as a Chaplain with the Royal Navy rising to become Chaplain of the Fleet from 1929 to 1933, after which he was Dean of Gibraltar. Evacuated to England in 1941 due to illness, he became civilian Vicar of Sparkwell then Chaplain to the Lord Mayor of Bristol at St Mark`s Church, College Green.

He was awarded the OBE in 1919 and appointed a Companion of the Order of the Bath in 1932. On 25 January 1929 he was appointed as Honorary Chaplain to HM King George V. He was an Honorary Canon of Portsmouth Cathedral and was appointed Deputy Lieutenant of Gloucester and of Bristol on 3 June 1950.

== Family ==
Knight-Adkin was the second son of the Rev Harry Kenrick Knight-Adkin (1851–1928) and Georgina Elizabeth Knight (1849–1930). He was born in Cheltenham on 17 August 1880.

He married Elizabeth Cuff Napier (1891–1984) at St Andrew's-by-the-Green, Glasgow on 20 December 1915. His bride was the daughter of Colonel Alexander Napier RAMC. They had one child, Peter Napier Knight-Adkin, who died at Portsmouth in 1918.

Walter died at his home at 17 Miles Road, Bristol on 24 May 1957. His wife was to live a further 27 years.

His elder brother was the war poet James Harry Knight-Adkin. His younger brother, Frederick John Knight-Adkin, after a period working as a journalist and author in New York, emigrated to Argentina where he became a successful cattle rancher. He had two sisters, Georgina Noel Knight-Adkin, a photographer in Bristol, and Violet Doris Knight-Adkin who died at the age of 19.

== Naval career ==
- 1910 HMS Lancaster
- 1912 HMS Victory
- 1913 HMS Conqueror
- 1916 HMS Victory
- 1919 HMS Revenge
- 1920 RN College Dartmouth
- 1923 HMS Queen Elizabeth
- 1924 HMS Victory
- 1929 Royal Naval College, Greenwich

Church of England titles
Preceded by Robert McKew	Chaplain of the Fleet; 1929–1933	Succeeded by Charles Peshall
Preceded by Robert McKew	Honorary Chaplain to the King; 1929 – 1933	Succeeded by Charles Peshall
Preceded by Geoffrey Hodgson Warde	Dean of Gibraltar; 1933 – 1941	Succeeded by William Ashley-Brown
