= Suffragan diocese =

Part of an ecclesiastical province

A suffragan diocese is one of the dioceses other than the metropolitan archdiocese that constitute an ecclesiastical province. It exists in some Christian denominations, in particular the Catholic Church, the Episcopal Church, Coptic Orthodox Church of Alexandria, and the Romanian Orthodox Church.

In the Catholic Church, although such a diocese is governed by its own bishop or ordinary, who is the suffragan bishop, the metropolitan archbishop has in its regard certain rights and duties of oversight. He has no power of governance within a suffragan diocese, but has some limited rights and duties to intervene in cases of neglect by the authorities of the diocese itself.

== See also ==
- Suffragan bishop
- Suffragan Bishop in Europe (a title in the Church of England)
- List of Catholic archdioceses (by country and continent)
- List of Catholic dioceses (alphabetical) (including archdioceses)
- List of Catholic dioceses (structured view) (including archdioceses)
