= Paul Vrolijk =

Paul Dick Vrolijk (born 1964) is an Anglican priest and former leader within the Church of England. He served as Senior Chaplain and Canon Chancellor of the Pro-Cathedral of Holy Trinity, Brussels 2015-2023, and Archdeacon of the North West Europe archdeaconry of the Diocese in Europe 2016-2020.

Vrolijk was educated at the Delft University of Technology and Trinity College, Bristol. He was ordained deacon in 2004 and priest in 2005. He was Non-stipendiary minister at St Michael, Stoke Gifford Bristol. He then served at Bordeaux, Chancelade, Limeuil, Lot-et-Garonne and Monteton, before coming to Brussels.
