= Peter Duplock =

English Anglican clergyman (1916–2011)

Peter Montgomery Duplock, OBE (6 September 1916 – 16 September 2011) was an Anglican clergyman who served as Archdeacon of North West Europe from 1980 to 1981.

== Biography ==
Duplock was born on 6 September 1916 in Surrey, England. He was educated at Queens' College, Cambridge and Ridley Hall, Cambridge. He was ordained deacon in 1940 and priest in 1941. After a curacy in Morden he was a Chaplain to the Forces during World War II. He held incumbencies in Nottingham, Loddington and Kettering. He then served at Geneva, Brussels, Charleroi, Liège and Waterloo. He was the first Chancellor of Brussels Pro-Cathedral. In 1976, he was appointed an Officer of the Order of the British Empire, for services to the church and the British community in Belgium. His last post (1981 to 1986) was at Breamore.

He died in Royal Surrey County Hospital in Guildford, aged 95.
