= John Rowlands (priest) =

Daniel John Rowlands (known as John; 1925 – 13 September 2004) was an eminent Anglican priest in the 20th century.

Rowlands was born in 1925 and educated at Bromsgrove School and Pembroke College, Cambridge. He was ordained in 1952. He was a Curate at Mary, Woodford and then with the Mission to Seaman until 1975 when he left to become vicar at St Mary's church, Woodbridge, Suffolk. In 1983 he became Dean of Gibraltar, a post he held for 3 years. In 1985, he returned to his home in West Wales where he was Rural Dean of Glyn Aeron until his retirement in 1995. He died on 13 September 2004.

Church of England titles
Preceded by Robert Pope	Dean of Gibraltar; 1983–1985	Succeeded by Anthony Nind
