= Robert Pope (priest) =

English Anglican clergyman

Robert William Pope (OBE) was an eminent Anglican clergyman in the 20th century.

He was born on 20 May 1918 and received his degree from Durham University, but in fact completed his theological training at St Augustine's College, Canterbury, whose programs were then validated by Durham. He was ordained deacon in 1939 and priest in 1940 and began his career with curacies at Holy Trinity, Gravesend and St. Nicolas' Church, Guildford. In 1944 he joined the Royal Navy as a chaplain serving until 1971 when he became vicar of Whitchurch. In 1978 he was appointed Dean of Gibraltar, a post he held until 1983. He died on 15 September 2002.

== Notes ==
Church of England titles
Preceded by Ambrose Walter Marcus Weekes	Dean of Gibraltar; 1978–1983	Succeeded by Daniel John Rowlands
