= Ken Giggall =

English Anglican bishop (1913–1999)

George Kenneth Giggall OBE (15 April 1913 – 23 September 1999) was an Anglican bishop.

== Biography ==
Giggall was born on 15 April 1913 and educated at Manchester University. After a period of study at St Chad's College, Durham. He was ordained deacon in 1939 and priest in 1940 and began his ministry as a curate at St Alban's Cheetwood and St Elisabeth's Reddish.

In 1945 he joined the Royal Navy as a chaplain, serving until 1968 when he became Dean of Gibraltar. In 1973 he was appointed Bishop of St Helena, a position he held until 1979. He died on 23 September 1999.

== Notes ==
Church of England titles
Preceded by Godfrey Worsley	Dean of Gibraltar; 1968–1973	Succeeded by Ambrose Walter Marcus Weekes
Preceded by Edmund Michael Hubert Capper	Bishop of St Helena; 1973–1978	Succeeded by Edward Alexander Cannan
