= Decimus Govett =

English Anglican priest (1827–1912)

Decimus Storry Govett (1827 – 30 August 1912) was an Anglican priest in the last decades of the 19th century and the first two of the 20th.

Govett was born in 1827 in Staines, Middlesex, the sixth son of 11 children born to Rev. Robert Govett, the Vicar of Staines, and Sarah Romaine. Civil servant William Govett Romaine was his eldest brother, while four of his brothers were ordained into the Church of England, including theologian Robert Govett.

He was educated at Wadham College, Oxford. After ordination he held curacies at Ashford, Staines and Frampton Cotterell and was then a chaplain at Antibes, Nice and Marseille; after which he became archdeacon, then Dean of Gibraltar. He died on 30 August 1912.

Anglican Communion titles
Preceded by Inaugural appointment	Dean of Gibraltar; 1905 – 1912	Succeeded by William Thomas Baring Hayter
