= David Shearlock =

British Anglican priest and author (born 1932)

The Very Reverend David Shearlock BA, FRGS, ARSCM

Dean of Truro
- In office 1982–1997

David John Shearlock is an Anglican priest and author in the last third of the 20th century.
He was born on 1 July 1932 and educated at the University of Birmingham. He was ordained in 1957 and began his career with curacies at St Nicholas, Guisborough and Christchurch Priory. He then held incumbencies at St Mary Kingsclere and Romsey Abbey. Finally he was Dean of Truro from 1982 until his resignation in 1997. He continues his Ministry in retirement based in Dorset.

== Notes ==
Church of England titles
Preceded by Henry Morgan Lloyd	Dean of Truro; 1982– 1997	Succeeded by Michael Anthony Moxon
