= Calderstones School =

Coordinates: 53.3825°N 2.9009°W

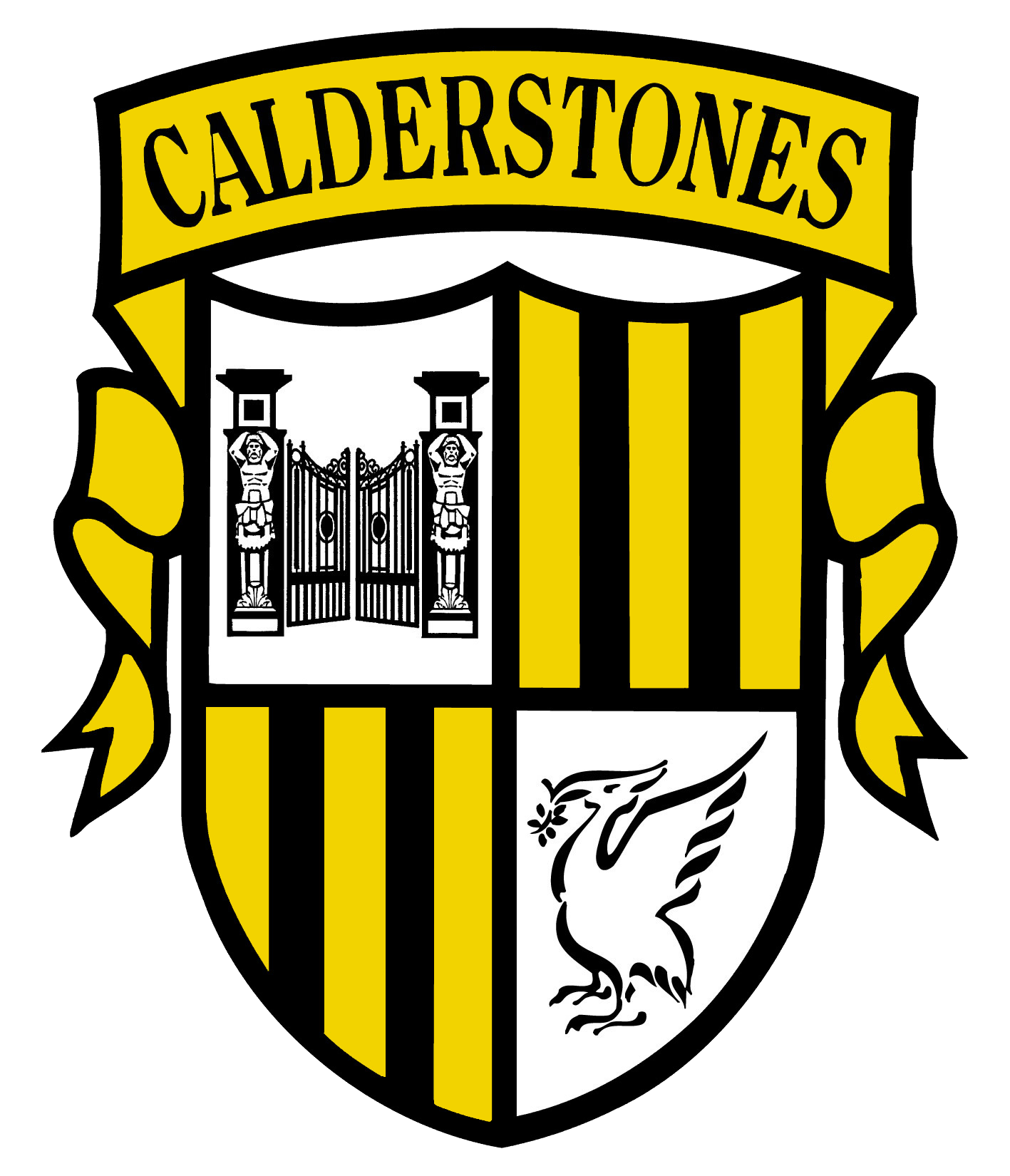
- School crest

Location
- Harthill Road; Liverpool, Merseyside, L18 3HS; England

Information
- Type: Community school
- Motto: "Ex Hoc Metallo Virtutem" – "Courage, Honour, Service"
- Local authority: Liverpool City Council
- Department for Education URN: 104698 Tables
- Chair of Governors: Richard Blanchard
- Headteacher: Lee Ratcliffe
- Staff: 150
- Gender: Co-educational
- Age: 11 to 18
- Enrolment: 1,483
- Colour
- Website: www.calderstones.co.uk

Calderstones School is an English comprehensive school located opposite Calderstones Park on Harthill Road in the Liverpool suburb of Allerton.

The school has several notable former pupils, including music producer Guy Chambers, the architect Sir James Stirling, and founding Beatles member John Lennon.

== History ==
The school was founded in 1921 as Quarry Bank High School for Boys and its first intake of 225 pupils was on 11 January 1922. The first headmaster of the school was R. F. Bailey (an old Etonian), who organised the school on the principles of public school houses. Subsequently, the first year boys' house was named Bailey.

In September 1967, Quarry Bank High School for Boys merged with Calder High School for Girls (a girls' grammar school on an adjacent site on Harthill Road) and Morrison Boys' secondary modern school (on Mather Avenue in Allerton), and adopted the name Quarry Bank Comprehensive School. The same year saw the abolition of the school's house system, whereby the pupils were divided between Mersey, Esmeduna, Wavertree, Sefton, Allerton, Childwall, Aigburth and Woolton houses.

In 1985, the school merged with Aigburth Vale High School, Aigburth, which led to the school operating at four sites with 1,800 pupils; it was also then that it adopted its current name. Aigburth Vale was previously a grammar school with around 600 girls. In 1989, the school divested itself of its Aigburth and Morrison facilities, retaining only the original Calder House and Quarry Bank estates. A new building to replace the Morrison wing was built within the existing school site. The former Morrison site is now home to a Tesco superstore, and the site of Aigburth Vale High School was redeveloped as flats.

== Refurbishment ==
In 2001, the school underwent a major refurbishment as part of a Private Finance Initiative scheme. The entire site was overhauled, with the old Calder Wing largely demolished, leaving only Calder House which now houses the sixth form. An Arts Wing was built to house the English, MFL, Arts and Music departments. The former Quarry Wing was divided into two separate buildings. One is Quarry House which houses the ICT and History departments, and the main office for the school. The classroom core of Quarry Wing is now known as the Science Wing and houses a number of science labs. Also in 2001, the school was given Science College status under the Specialist Schools Programme (abolished in 2011).

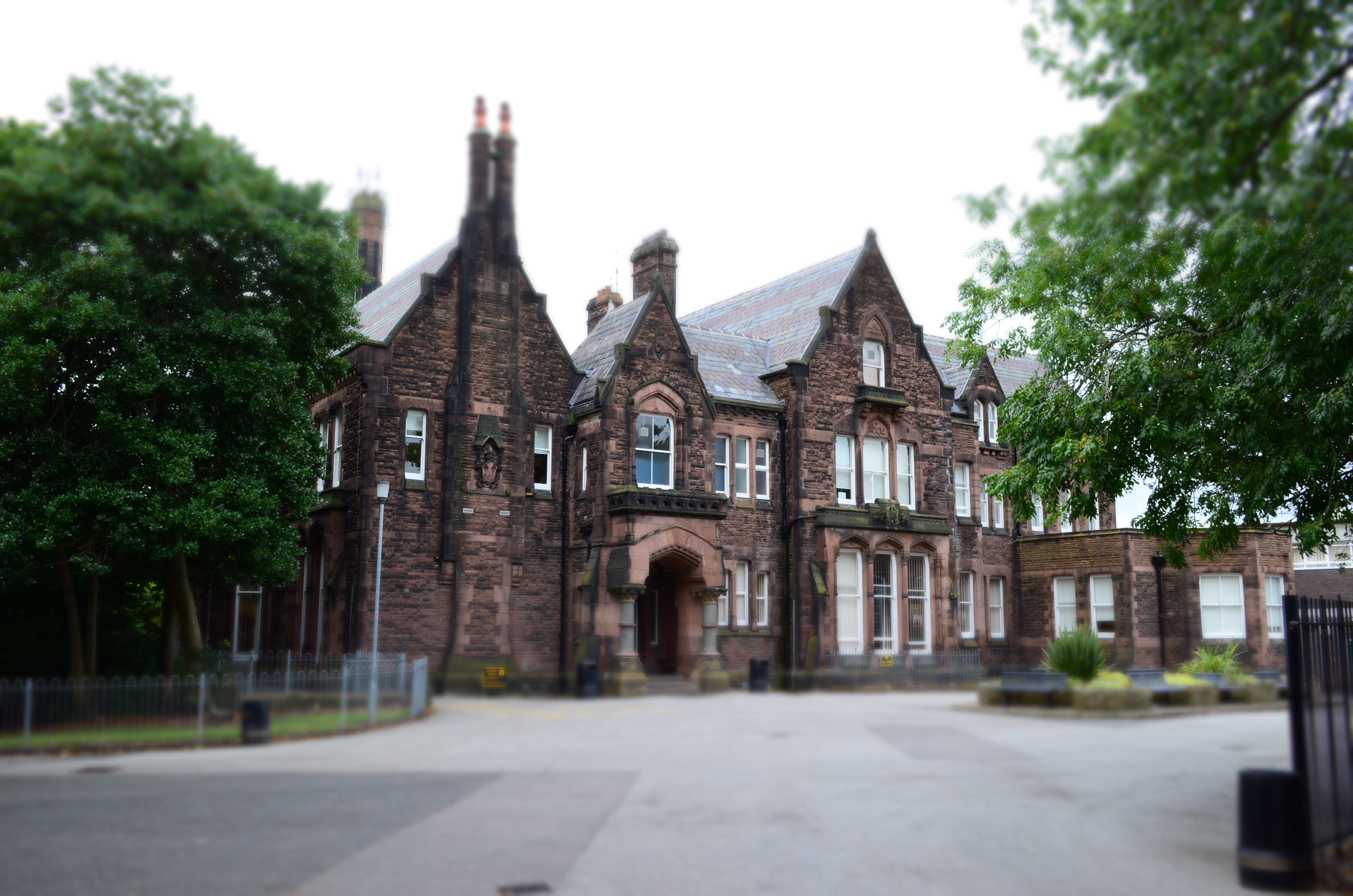
Front of Quarry House, part of Calderstones School, September 2012

== Headteachers ==
=== Calder High School for Girls (1921–1967) ===
1. Miss Florence A. Macrae (1921–1947)
2. Miss Georgina Baker (1947–1967)

=== Quarry Bank High School for Boys (1922–1967) ===
1. Mr R. F. Bailey (1922–1947)
2. Mr E. R. Taylor (1947–1956)
3. Mr William E. Pobjoy (1956–1967)

=== Quarry Bank Comprehensive School (1967–1990) ===
1. Mr William E. Pobjoy (1967–1982)
2. Mr John B. Chapman (1982–1990)

=== Calderstones School (1990–present) ===
1. Mr Brian Davies (1990–2012)
2. Mrs Elizabeth Russell (2012–2016)
3. Mr Lee Ratcliffe (2016–present)

== Notable former pupils ==
=== Quarry Bank High School for Boys ===
- John Ashton, academic in public health, Regional Director of Public Health for North-West England
- Rt. Rev. Jonathan Bailey, Bishop of Derby from 1995 to 2005
- Clive Barker, film writer, director and producer (Hellraiser, Candyman), books (Weaveworld, The Hellbound Heart), comic books (Razorline) and video games (Clive Barker's Undying, Clive Barker's Jericho)
- Brian Barwick, chief executive of the Football Association from 2005 to 2008
- David Basnett, trade union leader
- Michael Batty, Bartlett Professor of Planning at University College London
- Stephen Bayley, architecture writer and chief executive of the Design Museum from 1986 to 1989
- Edmund (Ted) Bellamy, professor of Physics at Westfield College, London from 1960 to 1984
- Doug Bradley, actor, who played the 'Pinhead' character in Hellraiser
- Peter Cheeseman, theatre director, pioneer of theatre-in-the-round and documentary drama
- Steve Coppell, footballer and football manager
- Les Dennis, comedian and TV personality
- Alan Deyermond, professor of Spanish at Queen Mary and Westfield College, London from 1969 to 1997
- Peter Goldsmith (Lord Goldsmith of Allerton), who was appointed as the Labour government's Attorney General in 2001
- John Lewis, archdeacon of North-West Europe from 1982 to 1993
- Derek Nimmo, actor
- Sir Daniel Pettit, Olympic sportsman and industrialist
- Joe Royle, footballer and football manager
- Labour cabinet ministers Peter Shore and Bill Rodgers, who adopted the name "Quarry Bank" as part of his baronial title
- Leo Skeete, footballer in the 1970s and 1980s
- Sir James Stirling, architect

==== John Lennon ====
John Lennon, rock musician, singer/songwriter, author and peace activist, and one of the founding members of The Beatles, attended the school after passing the 11-plus exam.

Lennon's band with Paul McCartney and George Harrison, before settling on the name The Beatles, was earlier formed under the name The Quarrymen, inspired by a line from the Quarry Bank school song. Lennon, at age 16, had formed the group with several friends from the school. After The Beatles became successful, for a while the school hid evidence of Lennon's attendance. In 2025, a teacher at the school said "When John left, he was that much of a nuisance and a bully and that much of a poor student, the school staff didn't want to acknowledge that he ever went to the school and removed any trace of him."

=== Calder High School for Girls ===
- Margaret Ursula Jones, archaeologist
- Judith Kelly, artistic director of London's Southbank Centre and Master of St Catherine's College, Oxford from 2025
- May Maple (1914–2012), electrical engineer, president of the Women's Engineering Society
- Diana Walford, haematologist and Principal of Mansfield College, Oxford from 2002 to 2011

=== Aigburth Vale High School for Girls ===
- Kate Ellis, crime fiction author
- Bel Mooney (briefly), journalist
- Elisabeth Sladen, actress (Doctor Who, The Sarah Jane Adventures)

=== Quarry Bank Comprehensive School ===
- Susan Bickley, mezzo-soprano and opera singer
- Guy Chambers (Sixth Form), songwriter
- Andy Merrifield, urban theorist
- John Power, former member of the band the La's and founding member of Cast

=== Calderstones School ===
- Marcus Holden, international rugby player, Cyprus Rugby National Team
- Geoff Rowley, skateboarder, co-owner of Flip Skateboards
- "Zombina" and "Doc Horror", musicians in Zombina and the Skeletones
- Thelo Aasgaard, footballer, Rangers and Norway national football team
