= Henry Lloyd (priest) =

Henry Morgan Lloyd DSO OBE (9 June 1911 – 16 April 2001) was an Anglican priest in the second half of the 20th century. He was born into an ecclesiastical family, his father being the Revd David Lloyd, sometime Vicar of Weston-super-Mare and educated at Canford School and Oriel College, Oxford. Ordained in 1935 he was a curate at Hendon.

He then served his country during World War II as a chaplain in the RNVR. He was awarded the DSO for his actions on board HMS Illustrious in January 1941; Illustrious, escorting a convoy to Malta, was subject to fierce air attacks, during which she was struck by multiple bombs. The award was for his "gallantry and exemplary conduct"; he "worked incessantly on behalf of the wounded with complete disregard for his own safety" and "was conspicuous on the quarter deck, where many wounded men were isolated and a fierce fire was burning below, far into the night". His practice of broadcasting a running commentary of the battle for the benefit of those of the crew who could not see what was happening became standard for all naval chaplains.

After the war he was Principal of Old Rectory College Hawarden and Dean of Gibraltar. Returning to England in 1960 he became Dean of Truro, a post he held for 21 years.

== Notes ==
Church of England titles
Preceded by George Nason	Dean of Gibraltar; 1950–1960	Succeeded by Godfrey Worsley
New diocese	Dean of Truro; 1960–1981	Succeeded by David Shearlock
