= John Lewis (archdeacon of North-West Europe) =

English archdeacon (1935–1994)

John Lewis OBE (1935–1994) was Archdeacon of North-West Europe from 1982 to 1993.

Lewis was educated at Quarry Bank Grammar School for Boys, Liverpool; Worcester College, Oxford; and Ridley Hall, Cambridge. He was ordained deacon in 1960 and priest in 1961. After a curacy at St Nicholas, Sutton, St Helens Lancashire, he served at Holy Trinity, Brussels (twice once as assistant chaplain 1963-4 and again as Archdeacon), St John's Montreux and St John and St Philips, The Hague.
