= Godfrey Worsley =

Anglican priest

Godfrey Stuart Harling Worsley (4 December 1906 – 10 November 1990) was an Anglican priest in the 20th century.

Worsley was born into an ecclesiastical family. His father was A. E. Worsley, sometime Rector of Georgeham on 4 December 1906 and educated at Dean Close School. He was ordained deacon in 1929 and priest in 1931 and began ministry as a curate at Croydon Parish Church. In 1933 he became a chaplain to the British Armed Forces. serving until 1954 when he became Rector of Kingsland, Herefordshire. In 1960 he was appointed Dean of Gibraltar, a position he held until 1969, and after which he was made Dean emeritus. He was of Rector of Penselwood from 1969 to 1979.

Church of England titles
Preceded by Henry Lloyd	Dean of Gibraltar; 1960–1968	Succeeded by Ken Giggall
