= Geoffrey Warde =

Bishop of Lewes (1889–1972)

Geoffrey Hodgson Warde (23 August 1889 – 20 May 1972) was an Anglican bishop in the 20th century.

== Biography ==
The son of Henry John Warde (a priest), he was born in Croydon, then part of Surrey, educated at Tonbridge School and Keble College, Oxford; in 1915, he married Eileen (daughter of F.K. Hogkinson, priest).

Ordained priest on 3 October 1915 by Arthur Winnington-Ingram, Bishop of London, at St Paul's Cathedral, he was a curate at St Pancras New Church. In June 1916, he was interviewed for a commission as an Army Chaplain, was described as 'Young, bright fellow' and, although an Anglo-Catholic in a predominantly low-church organisation, he was appointed and, in January 1917, posted to Salonika. He spent one year there, enjoying the considerable opportunities for sport, at which he excelled, but enduring the tragedies of serving near the front line, caring for the wounded, burying the dead and dodging machine gunner bullets. Like so many in Salonika, he caught malaria which terminated his service on the front line. He returned to England in January 1918 and was posted to East Leeds Military Hospital, which had been established in an old workhouse. After demobilisation, he was Priest-in-Charge All Saints, Pimlico and then Vicar of St Mark's, Regent's Park. From 1922 to 1928 he was Deputy Priest-in-Ordinary to George V and then Dean of Gibraltar. Returning to England in 1933 he became Vicar of Grantham and Rural Dean of North Grantham until 1939, then Archdeacon of Carlisle and ex officio a canon residentiary of Carlisle Cathedral before his last appointment as Bishop of Lewes (a suffragan bishop of the Diocese of Chichester). He was consecrated a bishop on All Saints' Day 1946 (1 November) at Westminster Abbey; he also became an honorary canon of Chichester Cathedral, 1947–1963. He retired in October 1959 and died at Hove in 1972.

Church of England titles
Preceded by James Cropper	Dean of Gibraltar; 1928 – 1933	Succeeded by Walter Knight-Adkin
Preceded by Grandage Powell	Archdeacon of Carlisle; 1944 – 1946	Succeeded by Alexander Chisholm
Preceded by Hugh Hordern	Bishop of Lewes; 1946 – 1959	Succeeded by Lloyd Morrell
