= John Paddock (priest) =

British priest, former Dean of Gibraltar

John Allan Barnes Paddock FRSA
- Church: Church of England
- Diocese: Diocese of Gibraltar in Europe
- See: Cathedral of the Holy Trinity, Gibraltar
- In office: 2008–2017
- Predecessor: Alan Geoffrey Woods
- Successor: Robin Gill (Acting Dean)

Orders
- Ordination: Deacon: 1980; Priest: 1981

Personal details
- Born: John Allan Barnes Paddock; 8 August 1951 Gloucester
- Died: 5 June 2023 (aged 71) Kent, UK
- Denomination: Anglicanism
- Residence: Kent, UK
- Spouse: Jennifer Paddock
- Occupation: Anglican priest
- Education: The Crypt School, Gloucester, University of Liverpool, University of Manchester (PGCE, 1975), University of Oxford (MA, 1981), University of Glasgow (PhD, 2005), Cardiff University (LLM)

John Allan Barnes Paddock FRSA (8 August 1951- 5 June 2023) was an Anglican priest and former Dean of Gibraltar.

Paddock was born in Gloucester and educated at The Crypt School, Gloucester, and the University of Liverpool, the University of Manchester (PGCE, 1975), the University of Oxford (MA, 1981), the University of Glasgow (PhD, 2005) and Cardiff University (LLM). He was ordained deacon in 1980 and priest in 1981. After a curacy at St Katharine's Matson he was a chaplain at the Lancaster Royal Grammar School and then with the RAF. He then held further school chaplaincies at St Olave's Grammar School, Orpington, and Royal Russell School, Croydon. From 1997 to 2000 he was the vicar of St Peter's Folkestone and from then until his appointment as the Dean of Gibraltar. Paddock retired in November 2017.

On 5 June 2023, John collapsed and died suddenly at home in Kent, UK. He is survived by his devoted wife Jennifer.

Church of England titles
Preceded by Alan Geoffrey Woods	Dean of Gibraltar; 2008 – 2017	Vacant Title next held by Robin Gill as Acting Dean
