= David Hamid =

Anglican bishop

The Right Reverend David Hamid
- Suffragan Bishop in Europe
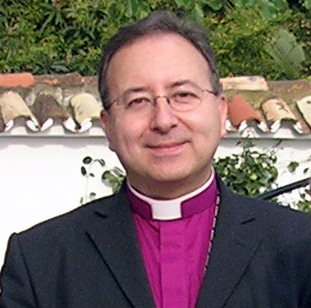
- Church: Church of England
- Diocese: Diocese in Europe
- In office: 2002–2024
- Predecessor: Henry Scriven
- Successor: Andrew Norman

Orders
- Ordination: 1981 (deacon); 1982 (priest) by John Bothwell
- Consecration: 17 October 2002 by George Carey

Personal details
- Born: 18 June 1955 (age 71)
- Denomination: Anglican
- Spouse: (m. 1978)
- Children: 2
- Education: McMaster University (BSc); Trinity College, Toronto (MDiv)

David Hamid (born 18 June 1955) is a retired Anglican bishop (Church of England) with British and Canadian citizenship. He was the Suffragan Bishop in Europe from 2002 to 2024.

== Early life ==
Hamid was born on 18 June 1955 in Scotland, to Scottish and Burmese parents. He holds dual British and Canadian citizenship. He was educated at Nelson High School in Burlington, Ontario, Canada. He studied at McMaster University, graduating with a Bachelor of Science (BSc) degree in 1978. He then matriculated into Trinity College, Toronto, and graduated from the Toronto School of Theology with a Master of Divinity (M.Div.) degree in 1981. In 2005 the University of Trinity College awarded him the honorary degree of Doctor in Divinity (DD).

== Ordained ministry ==
Hamid was ordained in the Anglican Church of Canada as a deacon in June 1981 and as a priest in 1982. After ordination he was curate at St Christopher's, Burlington, Ontario, and then rector of St John's in the same city. Following this he was mission co-ordinator for Latin America and the Caribbean for the Anglican Church of Canada. He was made a Canon of the Episcopal Diocese of the Dominican Republic in 1996.

His last post before his ordination to the episcopate was as the Director of Ecumenical Affairs and Studies of the Anglican Communion. In this role, Hamid was responsible for the Anglican Communion's relationships with other World Communions and with the World Council of Churches. He was also responsible for nurturing and deepening established relations of Churches already in communion with the Anglican Communion, namely the Old Catholic Churches of the Union of Utrecht; the Mar Thoma Syrian Church of Malabar; and the Iglesia Filipina Independiente. He also provided executive staff support to meetings of the Communion: the Lambeth Conference of 1998, the Anglican Consultative Council (ACC) and the Primates’ Meeting.

Highlights of his ecumenical role include:

From 2001 to 2003, Secretary of the Preparatory Group for Anglican Oriental Orthodox International Commission.

In 2000 established the International Anglican Standing Commission on Ecumenical Relations (IASCER), in accordance with the resolution from the Lambeth Conference of 1998. He served as Secretary of IASCER until 2002.

In 1999 established the Anglican-Baptist International Conversations, the first ever such international conversations between the Baptist World Alliance and the Anglican Communion, and served as the Anglican Co-Secretary of the body until 2002.

From 1996 until 2002 the Anglican Co-Secretary of ARCIC, the Anglican-Roman Catholic International Commission, during which time the commission worked on The Gift of Authority and Mary, Grace and Hope in Christ.

From 1996 to 2002 the Anglican Co-Secretary of the International Commission of Anglican-Orthodox Theological Dialogue, during part of the phase that led to the publication of Church of the Triune God.

From 1996 to 2002 the Anglican Co-Secretary of the Anglican-Lutheran International Working Group.

From 1997 to 2005 a consultant to the Joint Working Group between the WCC and the Roman Catholic Church, and edited the report presented to the WCC Assembly in Porto Alegre, Brazil in 2006.

In 2000 the Anglican Co-Secretary of the meeting of Roman Catholic and Anglican Church bishops from around the world, appointed by the two communions to map out how the global Anglican-Roman Catholic Dialogue was to proceed into the future. This meeting in Mississauga, Canada, led to the establishment of IARCCUM, the Anglican-Roman Catholic Commission for Unity and Mission.He served as Anglican-Co-Secretary of IARCCUM from 2001 to 2002, as a consultant from 2002 to 2008 and co-chairman from 2011 to 2024.

On 17 October 2002, at Southwark Cathedral, he was one (with Richard Cheetham and David Hawkins) of the last three people to be ordained and consecrated a bishop by George Carey before his retirement as Archbishop of Canterbury. As of 2023, he is one of the longest serving bishops in the Church of England. He retired effective 29 February 2024. In retirement he continues to serve as an Honorary Assistant Bishop in the Diocese of Southwark. He has Permission to Officiate in the Diocese of Winchester.

=== Views ===
In November 2023, he was one of 44 Church of England bishops who signed an open letter supporting the use of the Prayers of Love and Faith (i.e. blessings for same-sex couples) and called for "Guidance being issued without delay that includes the removal of all restrictions on clergy entering same-sex civil marriages, and on bishops ordaining and licensing such clergy".

== Personal life ==
Hamid has been married since 1978 and they have two children.

== Styles ==
- The Reverend David Hamid (1981–1992)
- The Reverend Canon David Hamid (1992–2002)
- The Right Reverend David Hamid (2002–present)

Church of England titles
Preceded by Henry Scriven	Suffragan Bishop in Europe; 2002–2024	Succeeded by Andrew Norman
