= James Cropper (priest) =

Anglican priest (1862–1938)

James Cropper (1862–1938) was an Anglican priest in the 20th century. Cropper was born to Edward William Cropper (son of John Cropper) and Frances Wright (daughter of Ichabod Charles Wright and Hon. Theodosia, daughter of Thomas Denman, 1st Baron Denman)

He was educated at Charterhouse School and Trinity College, Cambridge. He held incumbencies at West Ham, Seaton, Broughton-in-Furness and Penrith after which he was Dean of Gibraltar. Returning to England in 1927 he became Rector of Penshurst then Tonbridge before his last appointment as Master of Lord Leycester's Hospital, Warwick. He died on 11 January 1938

== Notes ==
Church of England titles
Preceded by William Thomas Baring Hayter	Dean of Gibraltar; 1921 – 1927	Succeeded by Geoffrey Hodgson Warde
