= Harold Isherwood (bishop) =

Anglican bishop

The Right Reverend Harold Isherwood LVO OBE
- Assistant Bishop of Gibraltar and of Fulham
- Diocese: Diocese of Gibraltar and jurisdiction of Northern and Central Europe
- In office: 1974–1977
- Successor: Ambrose Weekes

Orders
- Ordination: 1939 (deacon); 1940 (priest) by Henry Mosley
- Consecration: 1974

Personal details
- Born: 23 June 1907
- Died: 19 April 1989 (aged 81) Canterbury, Kent, United Kingdom
- Denomination: Anglican
- Parents: James & Margaret
- Spouse: Hannah née Walters
- Education: Selwyn College, Cambridge

Harold Isherwood, LVO, OBE (23 June 1907 – 19 April 1989) was an Anglican bishop who served the Diocese of Gibraltar and jurisdiction of Fulham (together) as Assistant Bishop and vicar-general.

== Biography ==
A son of James and Margaret Isherwood, he served the family business and joined the Church Army before his education at Selwyn College, Cambridge (proceeding Cambridge Master of Arts {MA Cantab} in 1946) and ministerial training at Ely Theological College. He married Hannah née Walters in 1940.

Isherwood was ordained a deacon on 24 September 1939 by Henry Mosley, Bishop of Southwell, at Southwell Minster and a priest in 1940. He served his title at Beeston, Nottinghamshire until 1943, when he took up the post of chaplain to National Nautical School, Portishead, Somerset. Starting in 1951, he took a series of posts in Europe, where he remained until retirement: as chaplain to Helsinki and Moscow (1951–1954), to Oslo (1954–1959), and to Brussels (1959–1970). He was appointed a Lieutenant of the Royal Victorian Order (LVO) in 1955 and an Officer of the Order of the British Empire (OBE) in 1959. In 1970, he became Vicar General of both the Diocese of Gibraltar and the Jurisdiction of North and Central Europe (the latter under the Bishop of Fulham) until 1975, and a Canon of Gibraltar (1971–1974).

In February 1974, he was consecrated a bishop at Lambeth Palace chapel, to serve the diocese and jurisdiction as Assistant Bishop of Gibraltar and Fulham; he retired in July 1977. His successor as Assistant Bishop, Ambrose Weekes, became Suffragan Bishop in Europe when the diocese and jurisdiction were merged into the new Diocese in Europe in 1980. In retirement, Isherwood continued to serve them as an auxiliary bishop, and the Diocese of Canterbury (where he was resident) as an assistant bishop. He died in Canterbury.

Church of England titles
Unknown	Assistant Bishop (Gibraltar and Fulham); 1974–1977	Succeeded by Ambrose Weekes
