= John Ashton (public health director) =

British public health director

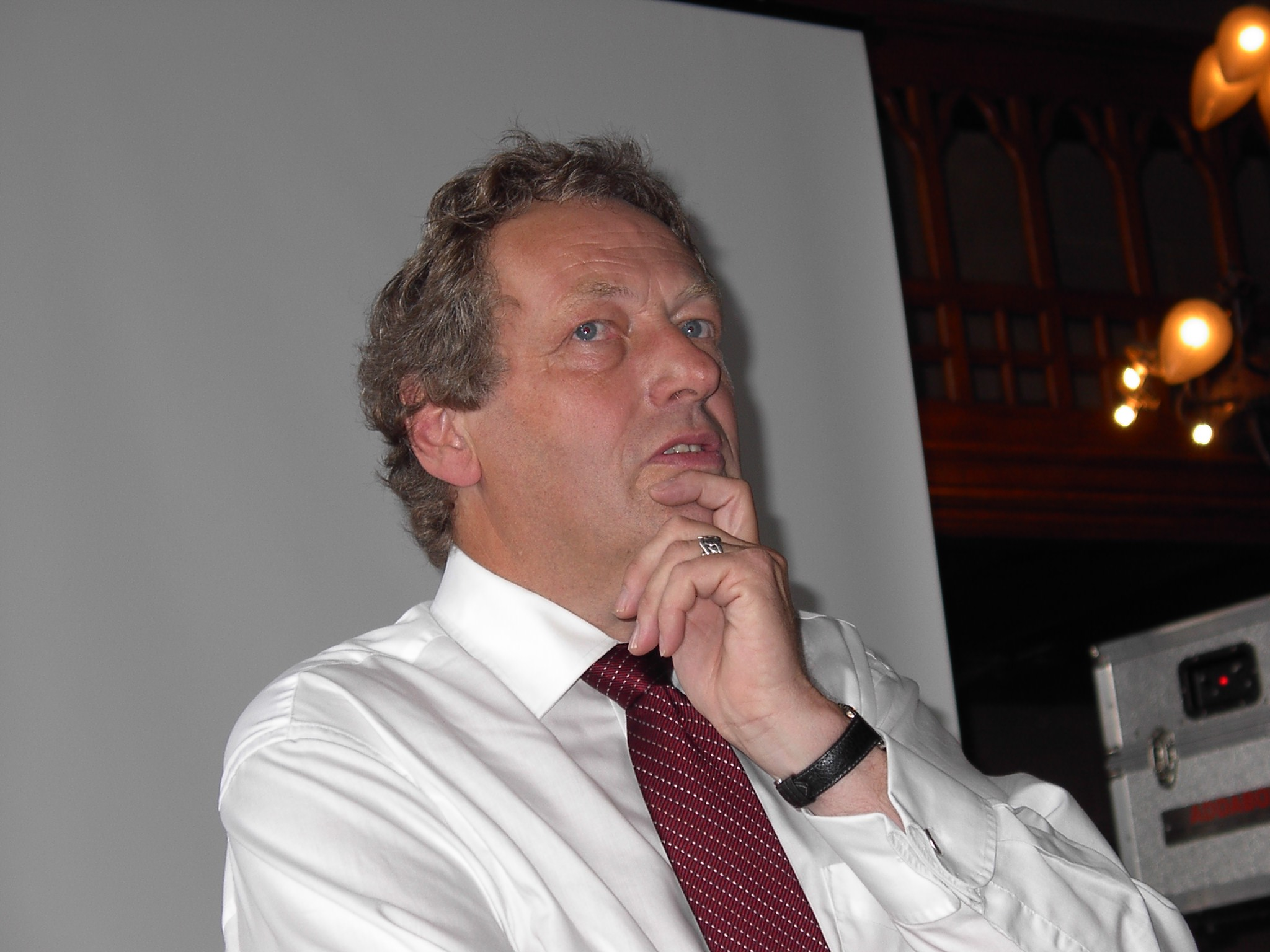
Ashton at the Socialist Health Association conference on the 25th anniversary of the Black Report

John Ashton CBE (born 27 May 1947 in Liverpool, England) is a British doctor and academic. Ashton previously held positions at the University of Southampton, the London School of Hygiene and Tropical Medicine and the University of Liverpool School of Medicine and as Regional Director of Public Health for North-West England for 13 years.

He was one of the initiators of the World Health Organization's Healthy Cities Project from 1986 to 1988 during which time it went from being a European project to a global movement and a pioneer of three public health initiatives.

Although a member of the Labour Party, Ashton has criticised both Labour Party and Conservative Party health reforms from an anti-Market perspective. In February 2012, the Government response to his criticism of the Health and Social Care Bill 2011 which he says "will totally dismantle the NHS" was raised in Parliament.

In January 2011, he was appointed a trustee of the National Museums Liverpool, and, in November 2012, he was elected as president from 2013 to 2016 of the Faculty of Public Health In September 2014, Ashton took voluntary leave of absence following his use of "inappropriate and offensive language" on Twitter for which both Ashton and the FPH apologised. On 26 September, the board said it had given advice to Ashton and were looking forward to his continuing his role in office.

In October 2021 he was shortlisted for the position of chair of the Cheshire and Merseyside Integrated Care System. Although he was highest scoring candidate the board decided not to appoint anyone.

== Education ==
Ashton was educated at Quarry Bank High School in Liverpool, Newcastle University Medical School and the London School of Hygiene and Tropical Medicine.

== Liverpool teenage pregnancy rate reduction programme ==
In 1982, the Health Education Council invited the University of Liverpool, Department of Community Health to submit a proposal for a pilot project to reduce teenage pregnancy and sexually transmitted diseases. At the time Liverpool had one of the highest teenage pregnancy rates in the country and the Department of Health had recommended specialised informal clinics for young people.

The study which liaised closely with the Health Education Council developed contacts with a wide range of community leaders to establish support for the project. Although a 1986 report by the Guttmacher Institute highlighting the disparity between pregnancy rates in different countries seemed to confirm the importance of effective contraception which in turn depended on "the degree of openness ..sex education ..and ..contraceptive advice," in January 1986, the council turned down the study without giving a reason. Ashton believes the Victoria Gillick affair and attempts to restrict sex education in schools played a part and that a "political desire ..to control people's behaviour... worked against a genuine public health interest". Despite advice from religious leaders that it was entirely their responsibility, the DHSS and DES insisted the programme contain a strict moral message. Later in 1986, fear of AIDS led to a change of attitude towards sex education.

== Syringe exchange programme ==
In 1986, following advice from a visiting US expert, Ashton, then a senior lecturer at Liverpool Medical School set up one of the World's first large scale syringe exchange programmes, a policy which was adopted "across the world". Subsequently, the first International Harm Reduction Association conference was held in Liverpool in 1989 and in 2010 delegates were told that "pioneering work carried out in cities like Liverpool into ways to reduce the spread of HIV in drug users has saved thousands of lives."

== Hillsborough disaster ==
Ashton was present as a spectator at the Hillsborough disaster on 15 April 1989. He tended to some of the casualties and made a statement about the events.

== Liverpool Public Health Observatory ==
In Autumn 1990, Ashton founded Liverpool public health observatory which serves and is funded by the five primary care trusts on Merseyside. The observatory was the first organisation to assess the medical effects of public policy. Ten years later, a network of public health observatories was set up.

== Legionnaires outbreak 2002 ==
In 2002, Ashton directed the response to the Legionnaires outbreak Barrow-in-Furness which resulted in 7 fatalities, compared with 15-20 expected. He was later awarded the 2002 Alwyn Smith Prize and Medal "for lifelong contributions to public health by the Faculty of Public Health."

== Obesity, alcohol and regional variations in life expectancy ==
In 2004, Ashton stated that the national diet was "a disaster and a public health emergency in the making" when research by a fitness magazine claimed "obesity and health had become a big issue for the north." Male lifespan in Manchester was almost five years shorter than the UK average and Ashton blamed cultural differences, saying that the North's industrial heritage included heavy drinking at weekends.

== Foundation trusts ==
In 2006, Ashton resigned as regional director of public health in the north-west over foundation trusts which he saw as a return to pre-NHS independent hospitals. He feared the result would be "a two-tier health service offering better care for the well-off and basic care for the rest" albeit all under the NHS brand. He also said that hospitals would be competing with each other and people would lose confidence in the NHS when they saw nurses being dismissed because of funding cuts. Ashton who had "developed a no-nonsense reputation" in his thirteen years in the job was regarded as "outspoken" and described himself as "fed up with government red tape."

== Cumbria shootings ==
In November 2010, Ashton was called before the Home Affairs Select Committee to give his views on the Cumbria shootings. Ashton believes the event would not have occurred without the media sensation of gun crime, in particular the reporting of the Columbine High School massacre. He feared the extensive coverage in Cumbria would sow the seeds for another event somewhere in the world.

== National Health Service reforms ==
In 2012, The Independent published an editorial claiming that Clare Gerada, the head of the Royal College of GPs would lose out on valuable contracts if NHS changes caused increased competition. Ashton was one of 23 signatories in a letter to the Independent criticising the NHS reforms as "ultimately damaging the health of the people of England" and rejecting as "grossly misleading" the earlier article. He received a letter from his primary care trust advising him that it was "inappropriate for individuals to raise their personal concerns about the proposed government reforms" leading to questions being asked in parliament. Health minister Simon Burns claimed the letter wasn't from the department and that primary care trusts should not be heavy-handed. The local BBC station was telephoned by "someone from Conservative party HQ", and told it should inform viewers that Ashton was a member of the Labour party and his criticisms were politically motivated, a suggestion which Ashton described as "an outrageous smear."

== President of the Faculty of Public Health 2013–2016 ==
=== Age of consent ===
In November 2013, Ashton said society had to accept that a third of all children were having sex at 14 or 15. He believed a debate was necessary about lowering the age of consent to 15 so that NHS advice was available. Ashton said that in countries where the age of consent was lower, teenage pregnancies were also lower. David Cameron said there were no plans to change and, whilst David Tucker of the National Society for the Prevention of Cruelty to Children supported a debate, he doubted if reducing the age of consent would help. Nick Clegg and shadow public health minister Luciana Berger both opposed the move but called for better sex education.

=== Scrapping of Warm Homes, Healthy People fund ===
In December 2013, Ashton criticised the scrapping of the fund which followed November's publication of reports showing 31,000 excess deaths in the cold winter of 2012–2013. He described the £20 million saved as 'peanuts' and said that it made no sense to pull money from a scheme which had demonstrated its success and popularity. In response, ministers said that £2.7 billion had been transferred from the NHS to local authorities to deal with the problem.

=== Advocation of a 4-day week ===
In July 2014, following the government's extension of the right to work flexible hours, Ashton suggested that a four-day week would reduce both stress and unemployment whilst allowing families to spend more time together. Ashton believes work related stress is a major mental health issue.

=== Call for doctors to be allowed to help terminally ill patients die ===
In July 2014, Ashton became the "most senior doctor" to support assisted dying. He called for a change in the law to allow doctors specialised in end of life care to end the suffering of those suffering "major discomfort."

=== International responsibility to deal with third world epidemics ===
In August 2014, Ashton criticised what he called "the moral bankruptcy of capitalism" for being unwilling to deal with the ebola epidemic which is perceived as only a threat to poor people. He also said the international community needed to address the conditions of squalor in which epidemics can thrive.

=== Coronavirus ===
In March 2020, Ashton criticised the British government's handling of the COVID-19 pandemic in the UK, saying their reaction had been too little too late, lacked transparency and failed to mobilise the public. He said "You can’t just plan this from an office in Whitehall. It’s pathetic. The government doesn’t seem to understand classic public health. You need to be out and about. You need to get your hands dirty – though preferably gloved and using frequent gel.” Ashton fears the NHS will be unable to manage the large numbers of people who will become seriously sick, he said further, “It’s a joke when they put up people to say they are really on top of it and if it spreads at a community level the NHS will cope, it’s always coped. The hospitals are full at the moment, A&Es are full, beds are full, intensive care is full.”

== Twitter incident ==
Commenting on the World Health Organization's call for a ban on e-cigarettes, which claims they can increase levels of nicotine in the air, Ashton said he didn't support a ban but wanted to avoid young people starting to smoke. During an exchange on Twitter, according to The Times, Ashton called one e-cigarette advocate a "cunt", and another an "onanist." and faced an investigation for his use of offensive language. On 16 September 2014, the FPH apologised for his inappropriate and offensive language and said Ashton had taken voluntary leave of absence. On 26 September 2014, following an investigation the Faculty of Public Health issued a statement stating that they 'look forward to Professor Ashton's continuation in the role of President'.

== Bibliography ==
- Everyday Psychiatry (1980), ISBN 978-0-906141-12-0
- Healthy Cities ISBN 978-0-335-09476-9
- The New Public Health ISBN 978-0-335-15550-7 John Ashton and Howard Seymour
