= Alan Woods (priest) =

English Anglican dean (1942–2026)

The Very Reverend Alan Woods
- Predecessor: Ken Robinson
- Successor: John Allan Barnes Paddock

Orders
- Ordination: 1970

Personal details
- Born: 18 July 1942
- Died: 15 January 2026 (aged 83)
- Education: Bristol Cathedral Choir School

Alan Geoffrey Woods (18 July 1942 – 15 January 2026) was an English Anglican priest.

== Biography ==
Woods was born on 18 July 1942. He was educated at Bristol Cathedral Choir School.

After qualifying as an accountant he worked for the Goodyear Tyre and Rubber Company until 1967. Following study at Salisbury Theological College he was ordained in 1970. He was a curate at St Francis Church Ashton Gate and then the youth chaplain for the Archdeaconry of Swindon and the warden of Legge House Residential Youth Centre until 1976. After this he was priest in charge of Neston and then Team Vicar of Greater Corsham, during which time he also became a chaplain to the Territorial Army. In 1983 he became the vicar of Charminster and Stinsford and in 1985 the Rural Dean of Dorchester. In 1990 he became Vicar of Calne and Blackland, Rural Dean of Calne and Chaplain to St Mary's School, Calne. In 1992 he was made an honorary canon of Salisbury Cathedral. From 1996 he was the Anglican chaplain of Malta and Gozo and Chancellor of St Paul's Cathedral, Valletta. He was the Dean of Gibraltar from 2003 to 2008, a post he combined with those of Vicar General to the Bishop in Europe and Archdeacon of Gibraltar from 2005.

After retiring to Dorchester he continued to be a locum in the Diocese in Europe as well as helping in his own parish and was also the Clergy Retirement Officer for Dorset in the Diocese of Salisbury. Woods died on 15 January 2026, at the age of 83.

Church of England titles
Preceded by John Kenneth Robinson	Dean of Gibraltar; 2003–2008	Succeeded by John Allan Barnes Paddock
