= Henry Scriven =

English and anglican Bishop

The Right Reverend Henry Scriven
- Suffragan Bishop in Europe
- Church: Church of England
- Diocese: Europe
- In office: 1995–2002
- Predecessor: Edward Holland
- Successor: David Hamid
- Other post: Assistant Bishop of Pittsburgh (2002-2008)

Orders
- Ordination: 1975
- Consecration: 8 March 1995 by George Carey

Personal details
- Born: 30 August 1951 (age 74)
- Denomination: Anglican
- Spouse: Catherine
- Children: 2

Henry William Scriven (born 30 August 1951) is an English Anglican bishop who has served in Europe and in America.

== Early life and education ==
Scriven was born on 30 August 1951. He was educated at Repton School in Derbyshire and later at the University of Sheffield. He then studied at St John's College, Nottingham.

== Ordained ministry ==
He was ordained in 1975 and served for four years in the Diocese of London followed by two years in the Diocese of Northern Argentina for the South American Missionary Society (SAMS).

With the onset of the Falklands War, Scriven and his family moved to Little Rock, Arkansas, where he served Christ Episcopal Church, Little Rock, as Assistant Rector for Education from 1982 to 1983.

From 1984 to 1990, Scriven continued with SAMS in Spain in the Spanish Reformed Episcopal Church. He then served for five years as chaplain for the British Embassy Church in Madrid in the Diocese of Gibraltar in Europe of the Church of England.

On 8 March 1995, he was consecrated as bishop by George Carey, Archbishop of Canterbury, as Suffragan Bishop in Europe. He was additionally commissioned by Edmond Browning as an assistant bishop to the Convocation of American Churches in Europe in May 1995.

From 2002 to 2008, Scriven served the Episcopal Diocese of Pittsburgh as assistant bishop. Scriven was the 980th bishop consecrated or (as in his case) received into the Episcopal Church in the United States of America.

In July 2024, he was commissioned by the Church of England Evangelical Council as an "overseer" to provided alternative spiritual oversight (not to be confused with the Church of England's official alternative episcopal oversight) to evangelical clergy and parishes in the Church of England who maintain traditional teaching on the doctrine of marriage and sexual ethics, following the General Synod's support for the introduction of a service of blessing for same sex couples.

== Personal life ==
He is married to Catherine and has a daughter, Anna, and a son, Joel.

He is the great-great-grandnephew of Joseph Scriven, Irish poet, best known as the writer of the poem which became the hymn "What a Friend We Have in Jesus".

Church of England titles
| Preceded by Edward Holland | Suffragan Bishop in Europe; 1995–2002 | Succeeded by David Hamid |
