= Hugh Hordern =

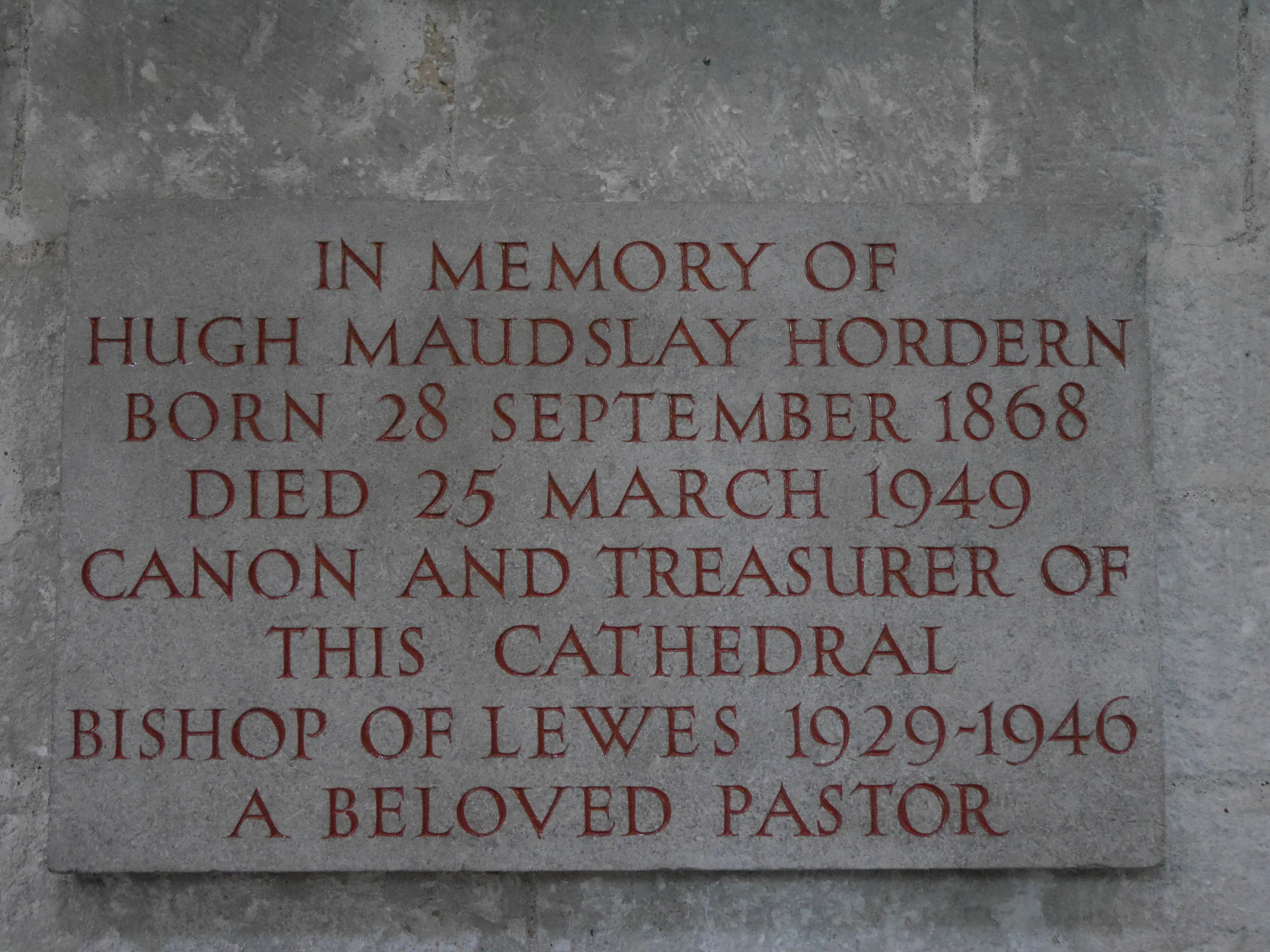
Memorial, Chichester Cathedral

Hugh Maudslay Hordern (28 September 1868 – 25 March 1949) was the sixth Bishop of Lewes.

== Biography ==
He was the great-grandson of the inventor Henry Maudslay and one of the founders of the Maudslay Society. According to Burke's Landed Gentry (1952) He was born on 28 September 1868 and grew up at Throwley House, Faversham, Kent. He was educated at Winchester and Christ Church, Oxford. He married Edith Augusta Sandeman, daughter of John Glas Sandeman. He began his career with a curacy at Warnham, and from 1894 to 1910, was Rector of Singleton. [Who Was Who, A&C Black] He was Vucar of St Nicholas, Brighton, from 1910 to 1924, also acting as a chaplain to the Territorial Army from June 1914 to 1922. He was attached to the 6th (Cyclists) Battalion Royal Sussex Regiment. ‘Most of my work was with them and in hospitals in Brighton during the War’. He was appointed to the episcopate in 1929, serving eventually for seventeen years. He died in post on 25 March 1949.

His grandson Peter Hordern was Member of Parliament (MP) for Horsham from 1964 to 1997. Other members of his family who were also involved in the First World War were his brothers: Boer War and First World War general Gwyn Venables Hordern, of Baughurst House, Ramsdell, Hampshire, (also an accomplished cricketer who scored a half century, in 1896, for the KRRC against a Free Foresters Team which included C. J. Kortright, whom Wisden described that year as the fastest bowler in the history of the game); captain Lionel Herbert Hordern, of Throwley House, Faversham, Kent; and Radcliffe Hordern of Warrenton, Virginia, whose son Herbert Radcliffe Hordern, served in the Irish Guards and died of wounds from the First World War. His son captain Charles Hubert Hordern, and nephew, general Herle Maudslay Hordern also fought in the First World War.

Church of England titles
Preceded by William Streatfeild	Bishop of Lewes; 1929–1946	Succeeded by Geoffrey Warde
