= Robin Gill (priest) =

British Anglican priest, theologian and academic (born 1944)

The Reverend Canon Robin Gill
- Acting Dean of Gibraltar
- Church: Church of England
- Diocese: Diocese in Europe
- In office: 2017 to 2020
- Predecessor: John Paddock
- Other post: Canon theologian of the Cathedral of the Holy Trinity, Gibraltar (2014–present)

Orders
- Ordination: 1968 (deacon); 1969 (priest)

Personal details
- Born: Robin Morton Gill; 18 June 1944 (age 81)
- Denomination: Anglican
- Spouse: Jennifer (m. 1967)
- Children: 2
- Education: Westminster School
- Alma mater: King's College, London; University of Birmingham

Robin Morton Gill (born 18 July 1944) is a British Anglican priest, theologian, and academic, specialising in Christian ethics. Since 2012, he has been canon theologian of the Cathedral of the Holy Trinity, Gibraltar: he was acting dean from 2017 to 2020. He was William Leech Professor in Applied Theology at the University of Newcastle (1988–1992), and was then Michael Ramsey Professor of Modern Theology (1992–2011) and Professor of Applied Theology (2011–2014) at the University of Kent. He has also served as a parish priest in the Church of England and the Scottish Episcopal church, serving in the dioceses of Coventry, of Edinburgh, of Newcastle, and of Canterbury.

== Early life and education ==
Gill was born on 18 July 1944. He was educated at Westminster School, an all-boys public school within the precincts of Westminster Abbey. He studied theology and trained for holy orders at King's College, London, graduating with a Bachelor of Divinity (BD) degree and the Associateship of King's College (AKC) in 1966. He remained at King's to undertake postgraduate research, and completed his Doctor of Philosophy (PhD) degree in 1969. He later studied at the University of Birmingham, graduating with a Master of Social Sciences (MSocSc) degree in 1972.

== Career ==
Gill was ordained in the Church of England as a deacon in 1968 and as a priest in 1969. From 1968 to 1971, he served his curacy at St Andrew's Church, Rugby in the Diocese of Coventry. From 1971 to 1972, he was a lecturer at Newton Theological College in Papua New Guinea. In 1972, he joined the University of Edinburgh as a lecturer in Christian ethics. Additionally, he was priest-in-charge of St Philip's and St James', Edinburgh from 1973 to 1975 in the Diocese of Edinburgh and priest-in-charge of the Church of St Michael and All Angels, Ford, Northumberland from 1975 to 1987 in the Diocese of Newcastle. He served as associate dean of Edinburgh's faculty of theology from 1985 to 1988. He was promoted to senior lecturer in 1986.

In 1988, Gill was appointed William Leech Research Professor/Professorial Fellow in Applied Theology at the University of Newcastle. He was also priest-in-charge of St Mary and All Souls, Coldstream, in the Diocese of Edinburgh during this time. In 1992, he moved to the University of Kent having been appointed the first Michael Ramsey Professor of Modern Theology. He was made an Honorary Provincial Canon of Canterbury Cathedral in 1992. He served as Chair of the Archbishop of Canterbury's Medical Ethics Advisory Group between 1993 and 2006. From 1997 to 1998, he was a theological consultant at the 1998 Lambeth Conference. From 2003 to 2011, he was additionally an honorary priest-in-charge of All Saints Church, Hollingbourne in the Diocese of Canterbury. He stepped down as Michael Ramsey Professor in 2011 and was appointed Professor of Applied Theology.

On 4 November 2012, Gill was installed as canon theologian of the Cathedral of the Holy Trinity, Gibraltar in the Diocese in Europe. He retired from the University of Kent in 2014 and was appointed emeritus professor. He has held permission to officiate in the Diocese of Canterbury since 2014. From 2017 to 2020, he was Acting Dean of Gibraltar Cathedral.

=== Views ===
Gill has expressed support for partial-decriminalisation of assisted suicide so that people would not be prosecuted for helping end the lives of their terminally ill relatives, stating in 2005 that "There is a very strong compassionate case for voluntary euthanasia". In a submission to the Select Committee on Science and Technology in 2007, he stated that he supports a gradualist approach to abortions in that early abortions are preferable to late abortions and the limit should be the point of foetal viability (22 weeks): "In terms of the gradualist position it would be consistent to reduce both the upper limit for abortions and the procedures that may be delaying first trimester abortions unnecessarily."

== Personal life ==
In 1967, Gill married Jennifer Margaret Sheppard. Together they have two children: one son (Martin) and one daughter (Judy).

== Selected works ==
- Gill, Robin (1985). A textbook of Christian ethics. Edinburgh: T & T Clark. ISBN 0567291278.
- Gill, Robin (1995). A textbook of Christian ethics (2nd ed.). Edinburgh: T & T Clark. ISBN 978-0567292803.
- Gill, Robin (2006). Health care and Christian ethics. Cambridge: Cambridge University Press. ISBN 978-0521857239.
- Gill, Robin (2010). New challenges for Christians: from test-tube babies to euthanasia. London: Society for Promoting Christian Knowledge. ISBN 978-0281062805.
- Gill, Robin, ed. (2012). The Cambridge companion to Christian ethics (2nd ed.). Cambridge: Cambridge University Press. ISBN 978-1107000070.
- Gill, Robin (2014). Textbook of Christian ethics (4th ed.). London: Bloomsbury. ISBN 978-0567621641.
- Gill, Robin (2017). Moral passion and Christian ethics. New Studies in Christian Ethics. New York, NY: Cambridge University Press. ISBN 978-1107176829.
- Gill, Robin (2020). Christian ethics: the basics. Abingdon: Routledge. ISBN 978-0367331108.

Church of England titles
Preceded by John Paddock as Dean of Gibraltar	Acting Dean of Gibraltar; 2017 to present	Incumbent
