= List of Gibraltar women Twenty20 International cricketers =

This is a list of Gibraltar women Twenty20 International cricketers. A Twenty20 International is an international cricket match between two representative teams. A Twenty20 International is played under the rules of Twenty20 cricket. In April 2018, the International Cricket Council (ICC) granted full international status to Twenty20 women's matches played between member sides from 1 July 2018 onwards. The Gibraltar women's team made their Twenty20 International debut on 20 April 2024 during their home series against Estonia.

The list is arranged in the order in which each player won her first Twenty20 cap. Where more than one player won her first Twenty20 cap in the same match, those players are listed alphabetically by surname.

== Key ==
General

- ‡ – Captain
- † – Wicket-keeper
- First – Year of debut
- Last – Year of latest game
- Mat – Number of matches played

Batting

- Runs – Runs scored in career
- HS – Highest score
- Avg – Runs scored per dismissal
- * – Batsman remained not out
- 50 – Number of half centuries

Bowling

- Wkt – Wickets taken in career
- BBI – Best bowling in an innings
- Ave – Average runs per wicket

Fielding

- Ca – Catches taken
- St – Stumpings affected

== List of players ==
Statistics are correct as of 3 August 2025.

Gibraltar women T20I cricketers
General					Batting				Bowling				Fielding		Ref
No.	Name	First	Last	Mat	Runs	HS	Avg	50	Balls	Wkt	BBI	Ave	Ca	St	Ref
1	Amy Benatar‡	2024	2025	16	323	70*	24.84	3	281	21	4/8	11.33	4	0	
2	Yanira Blagg	2024	2025	14	46	11*	11.50	0	244	19	4/9	10.47	2	0	
3	Nikki Caruana	2024	2025	16	369	54*	33.54	1	174	10	2/3	12.40	8	0	
4	Elizabeth Ferrary	2024	2025	13	166	68	15.09	1	155	20	4/6	8.85	1	0	
5	Helen Mumford	2024	2025	16	29	14	7.25	0	282	18	4/18	13.66	0	0	
6	Lauren Payas	2024	2025	13	116	54*	16.57	1	128	4	1/10	32.25	2	0	
7	Prabha Raghunath†	2024	2025	13	28	11	9.33	0	48	3	2/13	17.33	1	0	
8	Rosaleen Reilly	2024	2025	16	135	49*	12.27	0	–	–	–	–	1	0	
9	Niamh Robeson	2024	2024	1	–	–	–	–	–	–	–	–	0	0	
10	Lenka Tryb	2024	2024	1	–	–	–	–	–	–	–	–	0	0	
11	Ying King To	2024	2024	5	5	5*	–	0	–	–	–	–	0	0	
12	Sally Barton†	2024	2025	13	6	4	6.00	–	–	–	–	–	1	1	
13	Puja Chugani	2024	2024	1	–	–	–	–	–	–	–	–	0	0	
14	Christine McNally	2024	2024	8	84	19*	16.80	0	–	–	–	–	0	0	
15	Megan Mumford	2024	2025	6	0	0	–	0	12	2	2/8	9.50	0	0	
16	Misha Paryani	2024	2025	3	–	–	–	–	6	2	2/3	1.50	0	0	
17	Noelle Laguea	2024	2025	8	76	32*	15.20	0	36	2	1/14	25.00	5	0	
18	Harriet Currie†	2024	2024	1	0	0	0.00	0	–	–	–	–	0	0	
19	Lauren Sheppard	2025	2025	6	2	2	2.00	0	54	3	2/10	15.33	0	0	
20	Ariana Gianani	2025	2025	5	0	0	–	0	55	1	1/10	39.00	0	0	
21	Hannah Trinidad	2025	2025	1	1	1	1.00	0	–	–	–	–	0	0	
