= William Hayter (priest) =

William Thomas Baring Hayter (30 August 1858 – 21 August 1935) was an Anglican priest and teacher in the 20th century.

== Early life and education ==
Hayter was the third son of Harrison Hayter and his wife Eliza Jane Walker. He was educated at Summer Fields School, Charterhouse School and Brasenose College, Oxford.

== Career ==
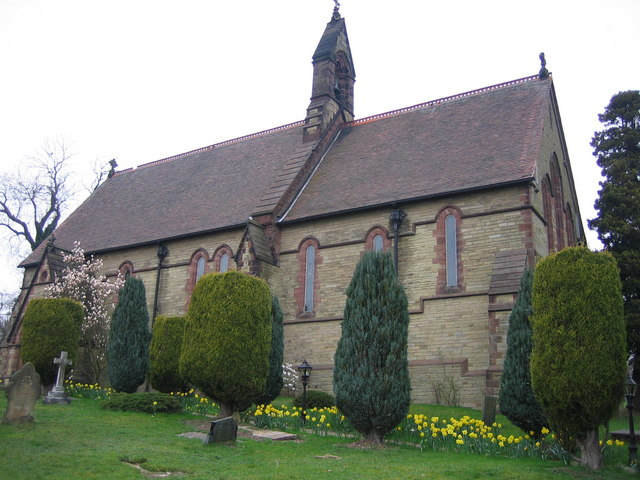
St Bartholomew's Church, Hints

After ordination Hayter held curacies at Icklesham (Sussex) and Kensington. He became vicar of Hints, Staffordshire in 1888 and remained there until 1900 when he became vicar of Horsley, Yorkshire. He became vicar of Westbury, Wiltshire in 1904, and then of Honley in 1906 and of Stratford Sub Castle in 1912.

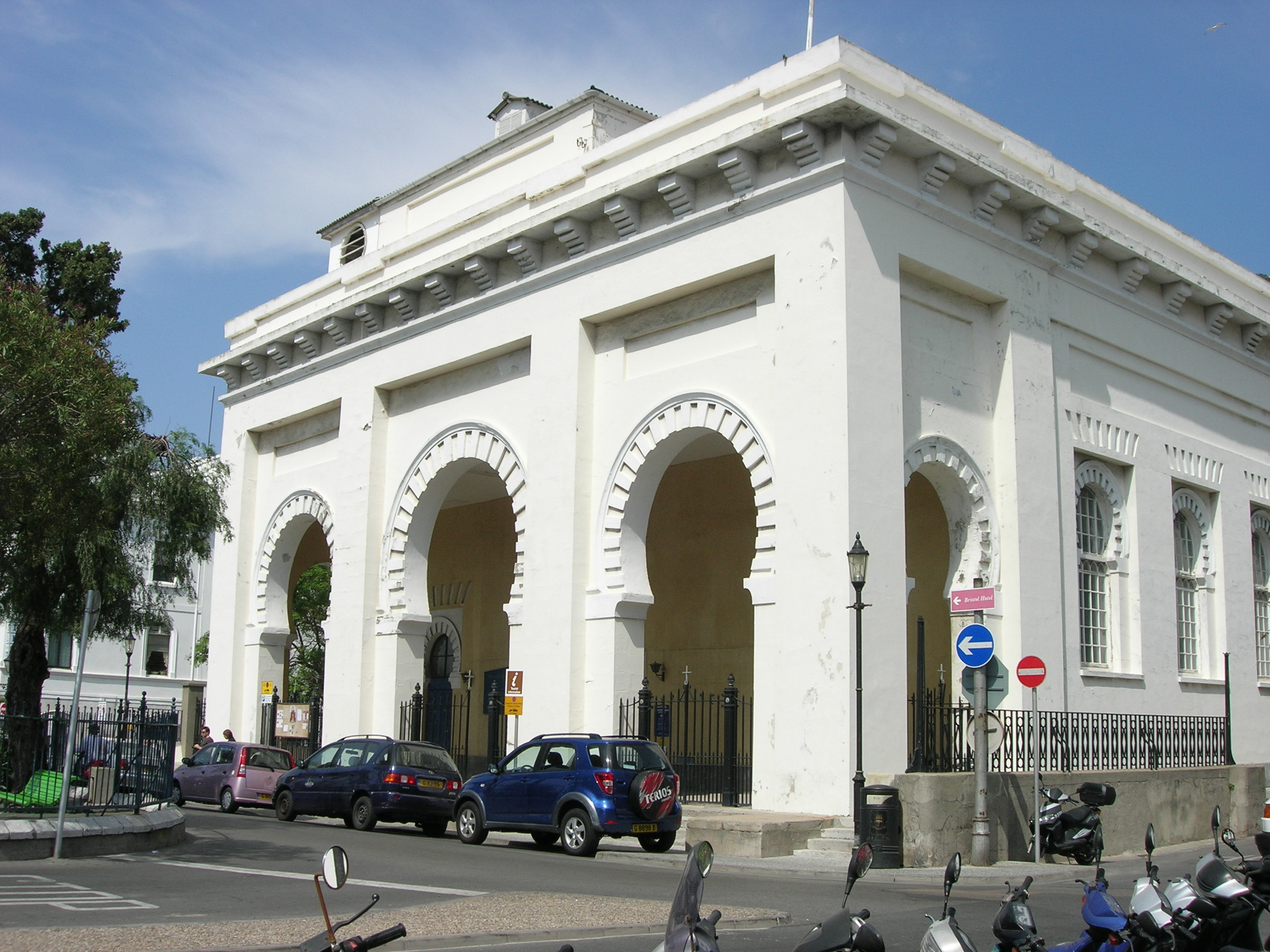
Cathedral of the Holy Trinity, Gibraltar

In 1913, he became Dean of Gibraltar, where he stayed until 1920. Returning to England in 1921, he became vicar of Dorking, Surrey, and in 1926 also became Rural Dean of Dorking.

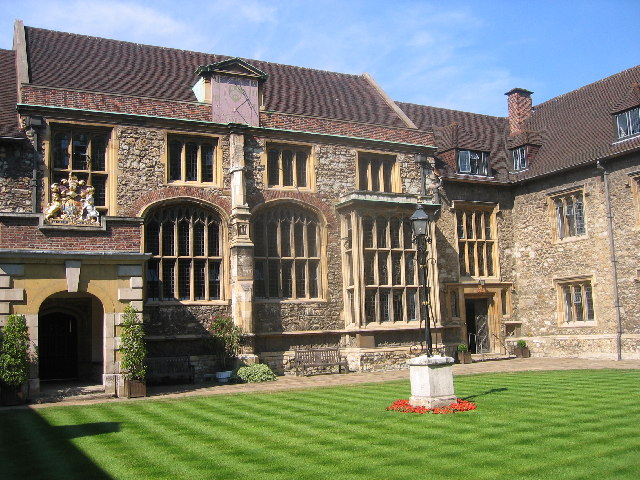
The London Charterhouse (Master's Court)

In 1927, he was appointed Master of the Charterhouse (the London almshouse associated with his old school), and Chaplain of the Order of St John of Jerusalem.

He retired to Penn, Buckinghamshire, where he died at the age of 77.

== Personal life ==
Hayter married Maud Beauchamp, daughter of Sir Thomas Proctor Beauchamp of Langley Park, Norfolk in 1889. They had three daughters, of whom the eldest, Dorothea, married the Italian sculptor Romano Romanelli. Hayter's sister Frances married Falconer Madan (1851–1935), Librarian of the Bodleian Library of Oxford University.

Church of England titles
Preceded by Decimus Storry Govett	Dean of Gibraltar; 1912–1920	Succeeded by James Cropper
