= Pro-Cathedral of the Holy Trinity =

Coordinates: 50.83527°N 4.357719°E

- French: Pro-cathédrale de la Sainte-Trinité; Dutch: Prokathedraal van de Heilige Drievuldigheid
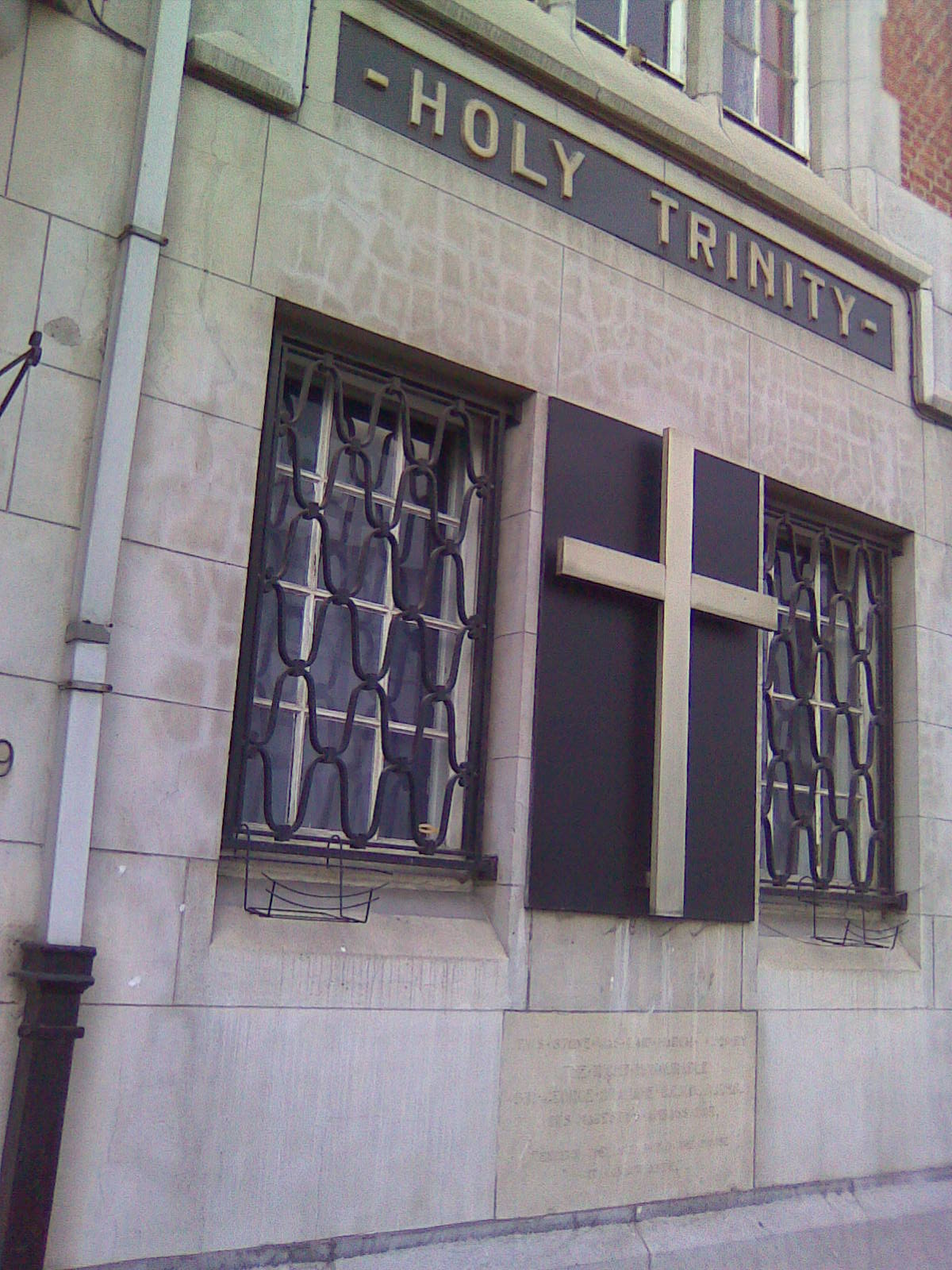
- Pro-Cathedral of the Holy Trinity
- Location: Brussels
- Country: Belgium
- Denomination: Church of England
- Website: holytrinity.be

History
- Status: Pro-cathedral
- Founded: 1958
- Dedication: Holy Trinity

Architecture
- Functional status: Active

Administration
- Province: Canterbury
- Diocese: Europe
- Archdeaconry: North West Europe

Clergy
- Bishop: Robert Innes

The Pro-Cathedral of the Holy Trinity (French: Pro-cathédrale de la Sainte-Trinité; Dutch: Prokathedraal van de Heilige Drievuldigheid) is an Anglican pro-cathedral in Ixelles, a municipality of Brussels, Belgium. It is part of the Diocese in Europe of the Church of England. The church is located at 29, rue Capitaine Crespel/Kapitein Crespelstraat, near the Avenue Louise/Louizalaan.

== Origins ==
The Pro-Cathedral of the Holy Trinity in Brussels was formed in 1958 by the amalgamation of the congregations of Christ Church and the nearby Church of the Resurrection (now closed). It is a pro-cathedral for the Diocese in Europe. The cathedral is in Gibraltar, called the Cathedral of the Holy Trinity (and there is a further pro-cathedral in Valletta), but Robert Innes, Bishop in Europe (and former Chancellor (priest-in-charge) of Holy Trinity), is the first bishop to be based in Brussels.

== List of chancellors ==
Upon the establishment of Holy Trinity as the pro-cathedral in 1980, the chaplain became the chancellor.

- Peter Duplock, 1980–81. Duplock had been Chaplain of Brussels since 1977. He was also Archdeacon of Belgium, Luxembourg and the Netherlands from 1977 to 1980; from 1980 to 1981 he was also Archdeacon of North-West Europe.
- John Lewis, 1982–93. Lewis was also Archdeacon of North-West Europe.
- Nigel Maynard Walker, 1994–2004.
- Robert Innes, 2005–14
- Paul Vrolijk, 2015–2023. Vrolijk was also Archdeacon of North-West Europe from 2016 to 2020.
- sede vacante, 1 September 2023–present

== Other staff ==
- Anthony Jennings, choirmaster from 1968 to 1972.

== See also ==
- List of churches in Brussels
- St. Boniface Church, Antwerp
- Saint George's Memorial Church, Ypres
- St Paul's Pro-Cathedral, Valletta
