= Suffragan Bishop in Europe =

Ecclesiastical title

The Suffragan Bishop in Europe is an episcopal title used by a suffragan bishop of the Church of England Diocese in Europe (in the Province of Canterbury). The suffragan bishop assists the diocesan bishop in Europe in overseeing the largest geographical diocese of the Church of England.

Before the current role was created by the erection of the Diocese in Europe from the Diocese of Gibraltar and the bishop of Fulham's Jurisdiction of Central and Northern Europe, there had been at least two assistant bishops serving both the diocese and the jurisdiction in a similar role.

== List of bishops ==
Assistant bishops (Gibraltar and Fulham)
From	Until	Incumbent	Notes
1974	1977	Harold Isherwood	(1907–1989) also vicar-general (1970–1975)
1977	1980	Ambrose Weekes	(1919–2012) also vicar-general
Suffragan bishops in Europe
1980	1986	Ambrose Weekes	(1919–2012)
1986	1995	Edward Holland	(b. 1936). Translated to Colchester.
1995	2002	Henry Scriven	(b. 1951)
2002	2024	David Hamid	(b. 1955). Retired 29 February 2024.
2025	present	Andrew Norman	(b. 1963). Consecrated 27 February 2025.
