= William Ashley-Brown =

Australian Anglican priest (1887–1970)

William Ashley-Brown (22 February 1887 – 2 September 1970) was an Australian Anglican priest in the 20th century.

He was born on 22 February 1887 and educated at St John's College, Armidale, New South Wales and the Australian College of Theology. Ordained in 1911, he was a Curate at Christ Church Cathedral, Grafton, New South Wales followed by a period as Vicar of Walgett. He was an Army chaplain in WWI. He was then Archdeacon of Bombay after which he was Dean of Gibraltar from 1943 to 1945. Returning to Australia in 1945 he became Rural Dean of West Charing.

He died on 2 September 1970, aged 82. His life is recounted in his memoir, Memory Be Green, which is illustrated by his daughter Joan Ashley-Brown.
