= Cathedral of the Holy Trinity, Gibraltar =

Cathedral of the Holy Trinity
- Gibraltar Cathedral
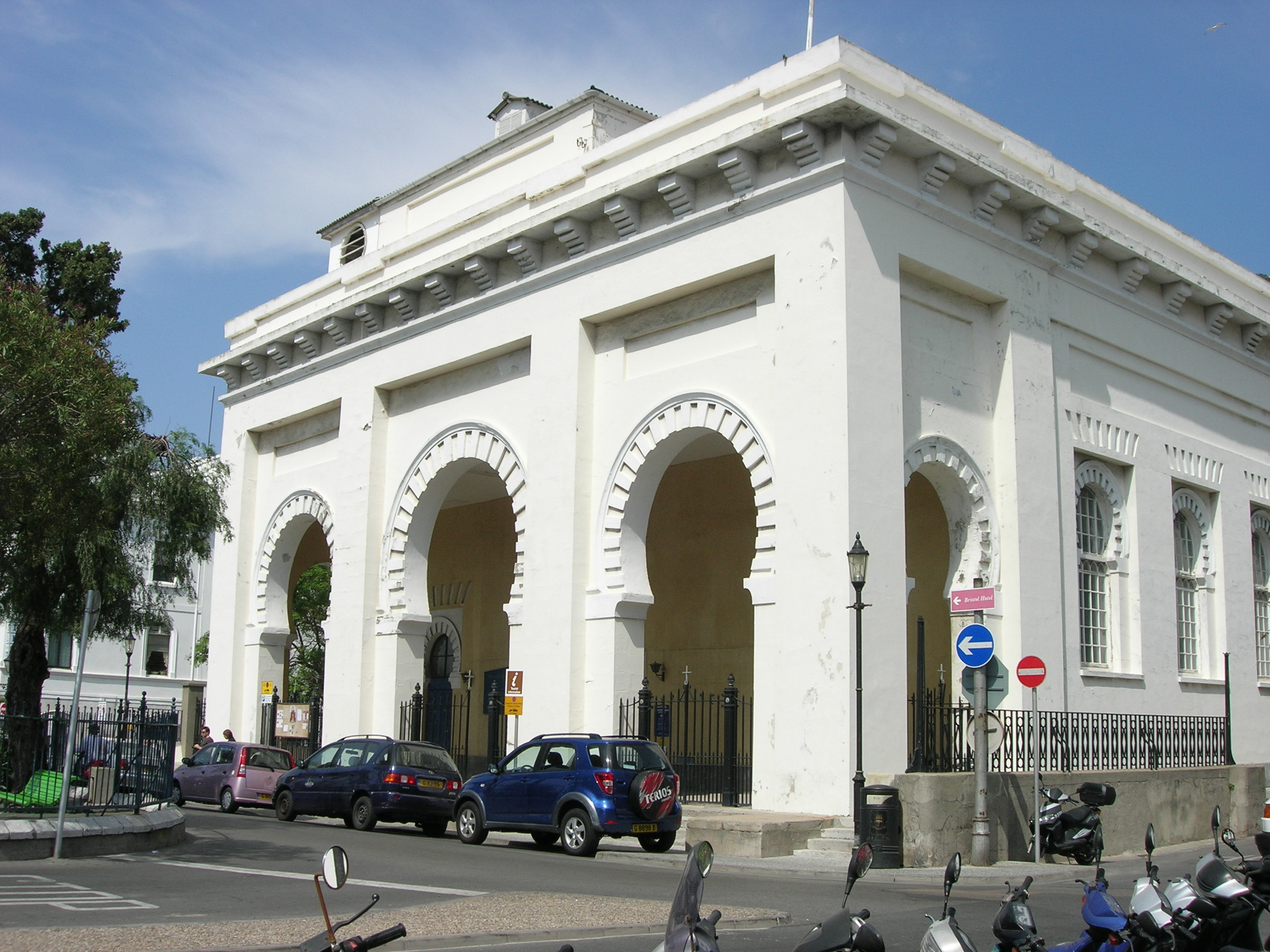
- Main entry of the Cathedral of the Holy Trinity in Gibraltar viewed from Cathedral Square, depicting its Moorish-style horseshoe arches.
- Cathedral of the Holy Trinity
- 36.138235°N 5.35406°W
- Location: Cathedral Square
- Country: Gibraltar
- Denomination: Church of England
- Website: holytrinitygibraltar.org

History
- Status: Cathedral (since 1842); Church (1825 – 1842)
- Founded: 1838
- Founder: John Pitt, 2nd Earl of Chatham
- Dedication: Holy Trinity
- Dedicated: 1838
- Events: Explosion of the RFA Bedenham (1951)

Architecture
- Functional status: Active
- Architect: Peter Harrison
- Style: Moorish Revival
- Years built: 1825–1832

Administration
- Diocese: Diocese in Europe
- Archdeaconry: Gibraltar

Clergy
- Dean: Ian Tarrant

The Cathedral of the Holy Trinity is the cathedral for the Church of England Diocese of Europe. Located in Cathedral Square, it is sometimes referred to simply as Gibraltar Cathedral, although it should not be confused with the Cathedral of St. Mary the Crowned, which is Gibraltar's Roman Catholic cathedral.

The cathedral is particularly notable for its Moorish revival architecture, particularly in its use of horseshoe arches. This is an architectural style inspired by Moorish architecture, appropriate given the period of Moorish control in Gibraltar's history.

== History ==
=== 19th century ===
The church was originally built to meet the needs of Anglican worshippers among the civil population of Gibraltar, as the King's Chapel was primarily reserved for military use. John Pitt, Earl of Chatham, who had arrived as Governor of Gibraltar in 1820, persuaded the British Government to sell a derelict building and use the money to build a church on the land. Building work began in 1825 and the church was completed in 1832. The original architect was Peter Harrison who prepared a design around 1740, without Moorish arches. More than eighty years later Colonel Pilkington of the Royal Engineers was in charge of the work, and the design was modified. During the building process, the partially completed church had to be used for a short time as an emergency hospital during an epidemic of yellow fever.

The church was consecrated in 1838 by Archdeacon Edward Burrow in the presence of the Dowager Queen Adelaide, widow of William IV. It was raised to cathedral status in 1842, with the creation of the Diocese of Gibraltar at the time of enthronement of George Tomlinson as the first Bishop of Gibraltar.

=== 20th century ===
The cathedral suffered no significant damage during the Second World War. After the war had come to an end, Bishop Harold Buxton made an appeal for the purpose of "Saying Thank You to Malta and Gibraltar", with the intention of raising funds to be spent on improvements for St Paul's Pro-Cathedral, Malta and the cathedral in Gibraltar. In Gibraltar the money raised was used for the construction of new vestries and the creation of a second chapel in the south aisle of the cathedral, to be dedicated to Saint George and in memory of all who lost their lives in the Mediterranean area during the war. A stone from Coventry Cathedral, which was ruined in the Blitz, is let into the wall behind the baptismal font. It is a small stone with a cross. The explosion of the RFA Bedenham on 27 April 1951 caused substantial damage to the cathedral, lifting the roof and smashing the stained glass. The windows in the sides of the building were re-glazed with plain glass, while the gathered fragments of coloured glass were used to construct the new stained glass window which remains in the east wall, above the high altar. The cathedral required extensive repair work and was not in use until Christmas of that year.

== Clergy ==
As with most Church of England cathedrals, the priest in charge of the building and its ministry is called the Dean, currently Ian Tarrant (John Paddock retired in 2017). The Canon Theologian is Robin Gill. Adrian Mumford is the honorary Lay Canon Precentor. The Bishop in Europe is based in Brussels, where there is another pro-cathedral.

== Gallery ==
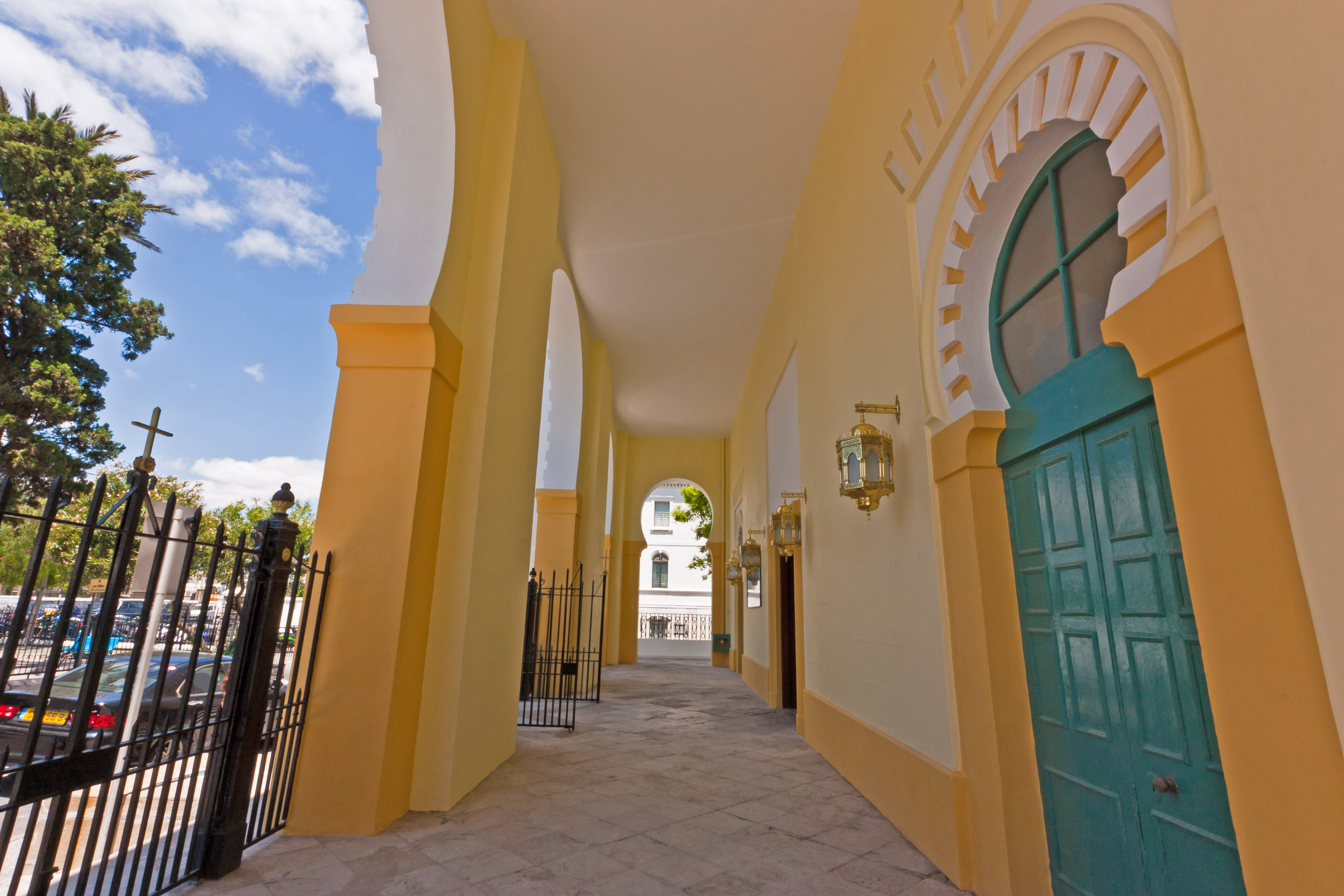
Cathedral's portico.

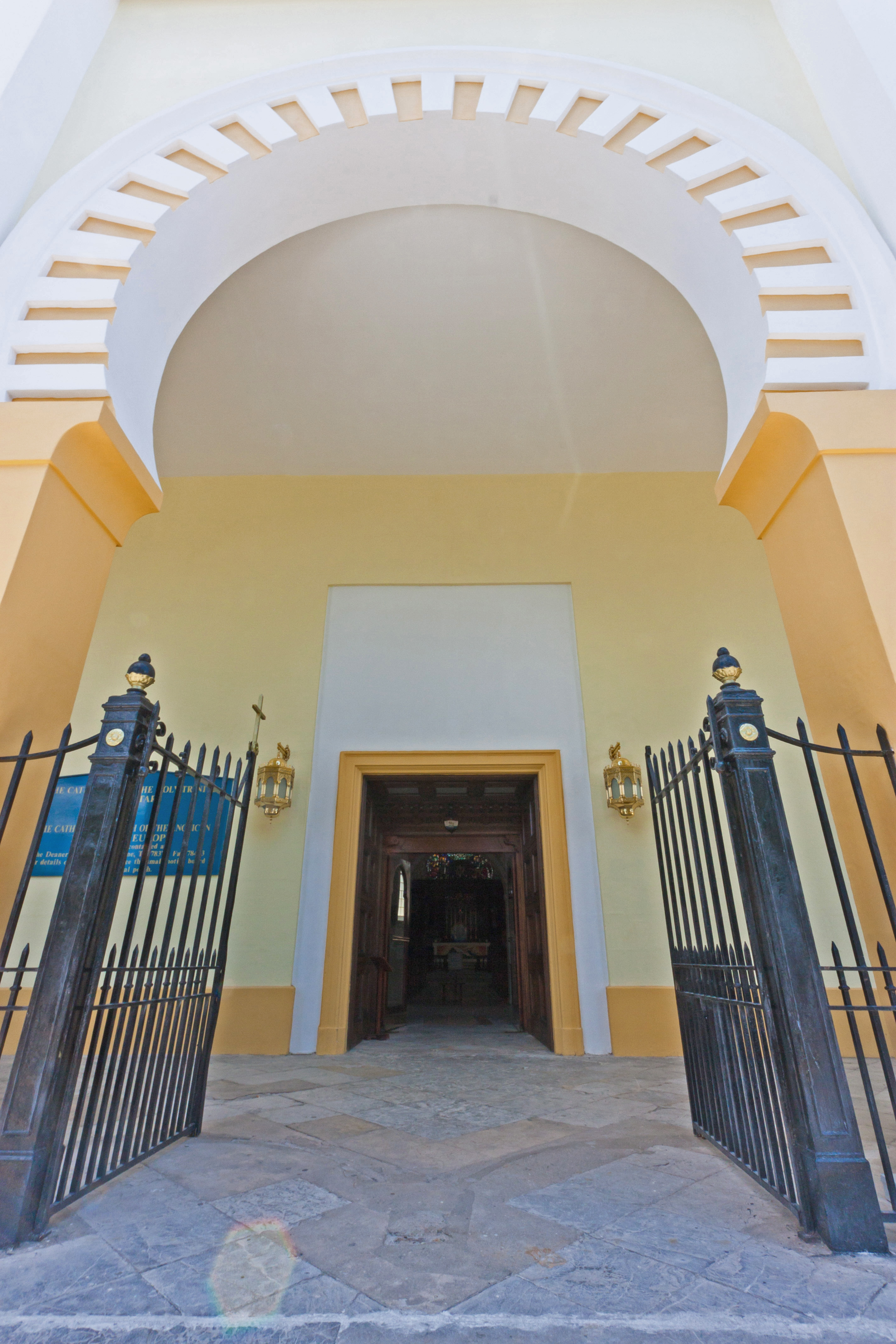
Cathedral's main entrance.

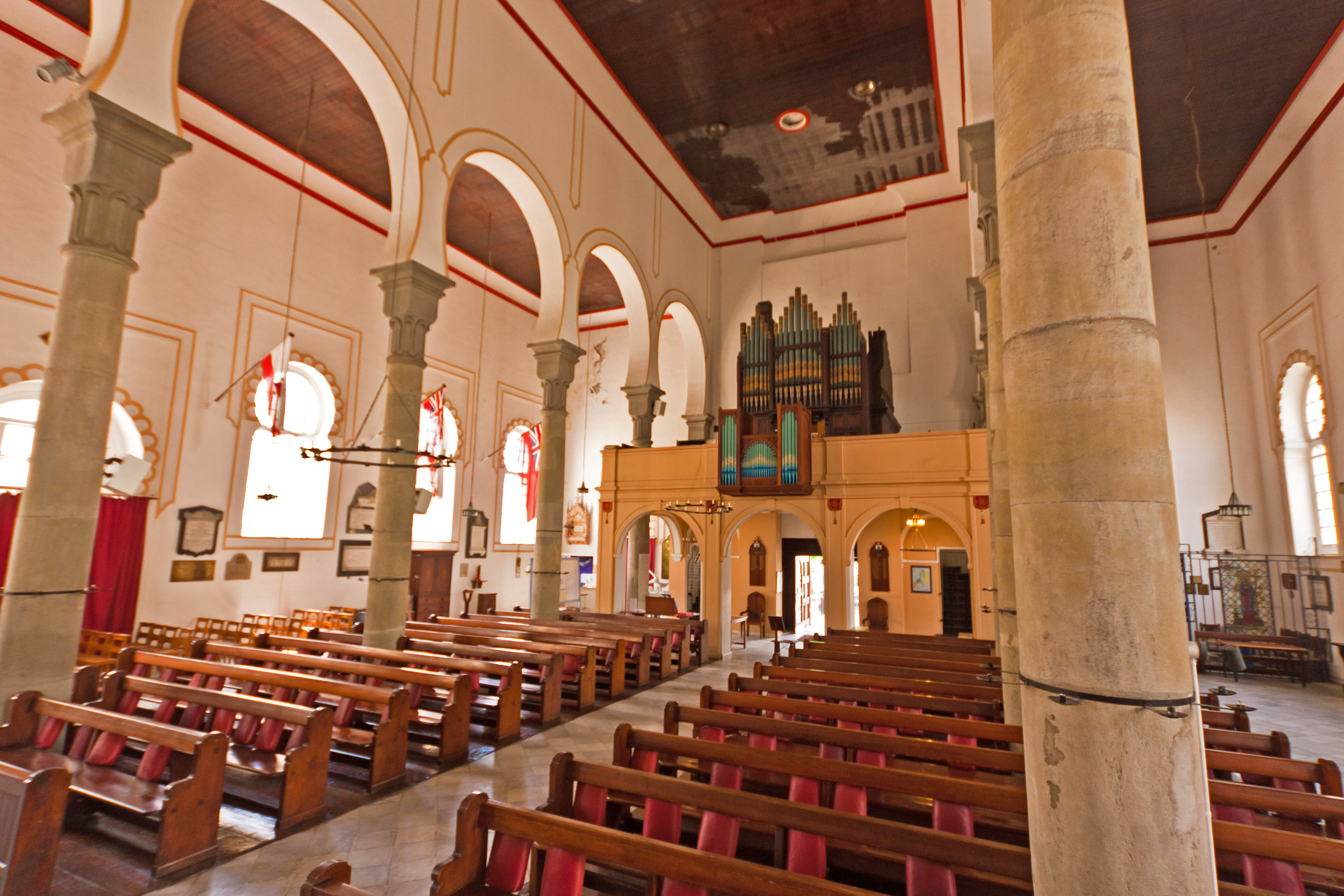
Cathedral's nave.

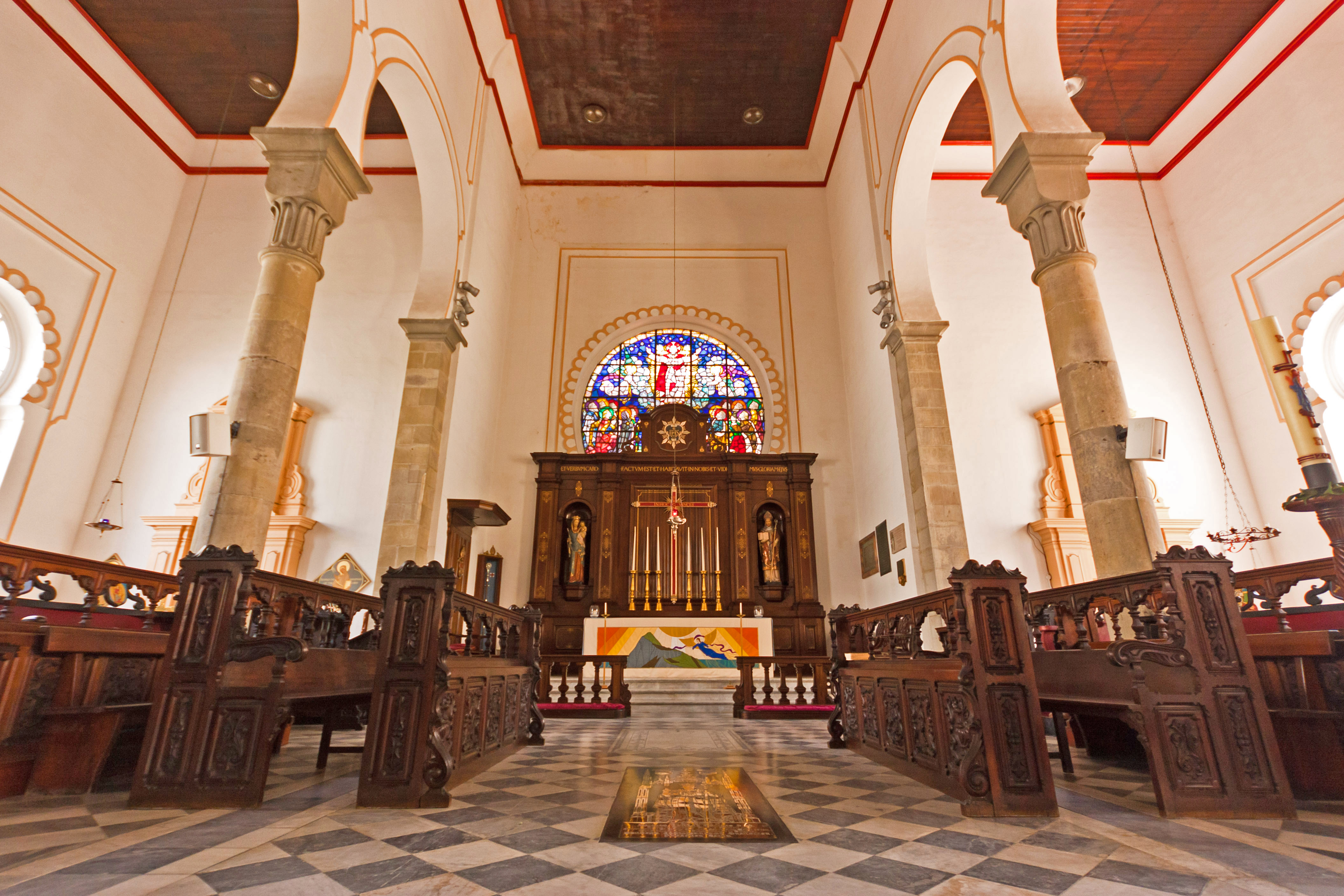
Cathedral's bema.

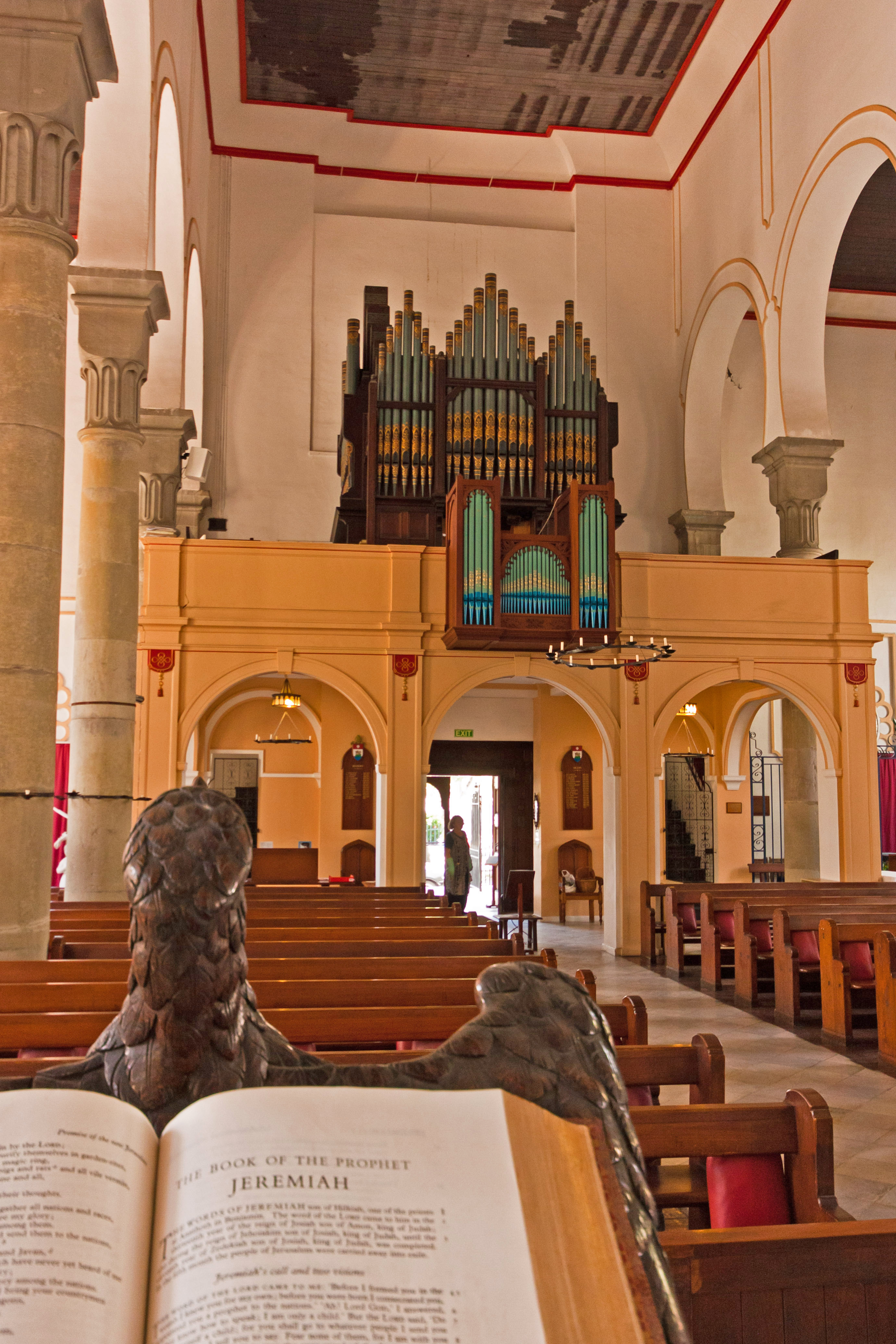
Cathedral's lectern and pipe organ.

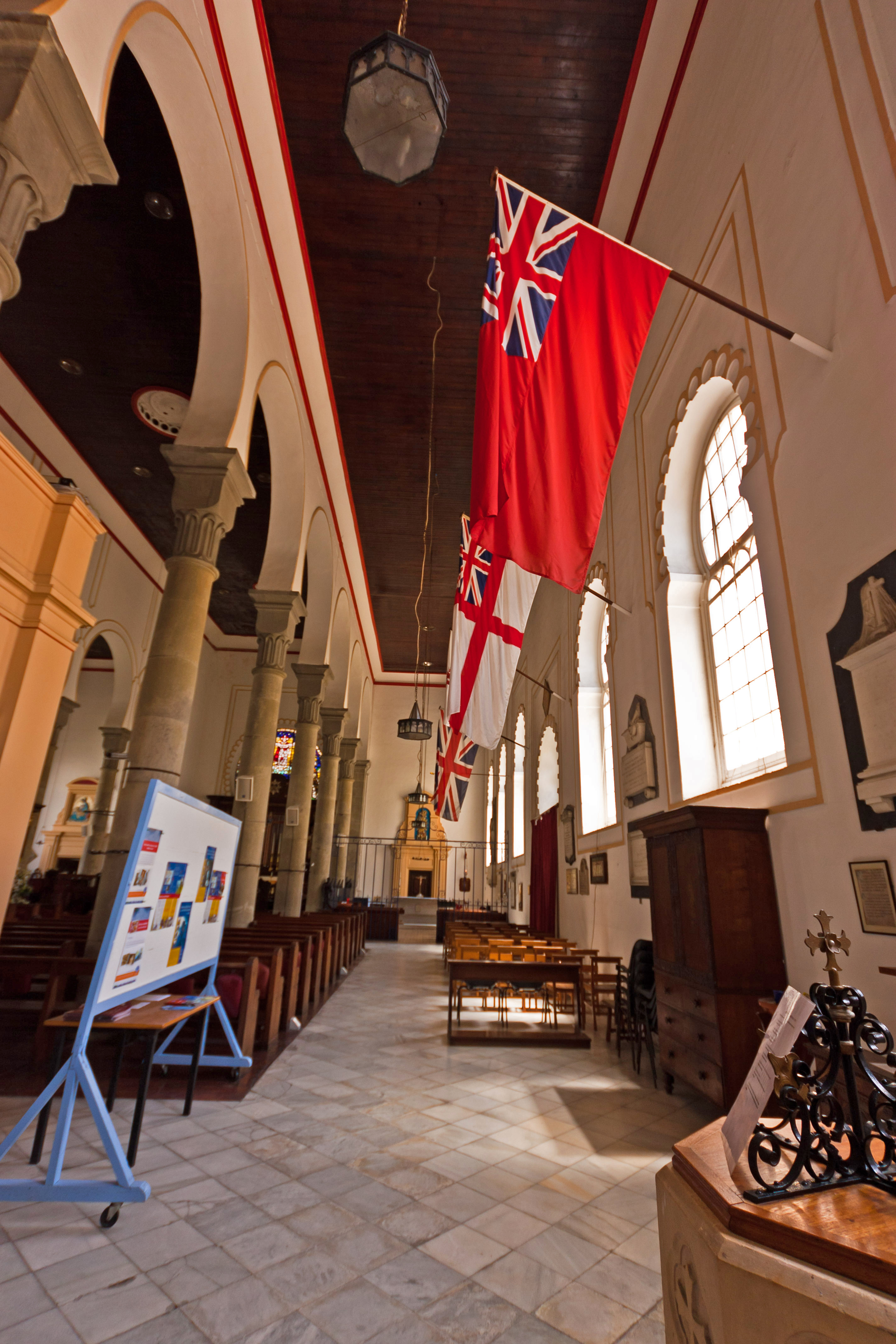
Cathedral's southern aisle.

== See also ==
- Anglicanism in Spain
- List of cathedrals in the United Kingdom
- Holy Trinity Pro-Cathedral, Brussels
- St Paul's Pro-Cathedral, Valletta
