= Trower =

Trower is a surname. Notable people with the surname include:

- Alfred Trower (1849–1880), English rower who won events at Henley Royal Regatta
- Charles Trower (1817–1891), English first-class cricketer and barrister
- Charlotte Georgina Trower (1855–1928), British botanical illustrator and botanist
- George E. Trower (1855–?), American politician
- Gerard Trower (1860–1928), Anglican bishop
- John S. Trower (1849–1911), American businessman and co-founder of Downingtown Industrial and Agricultural School
- Jonathan Trower (born 1979), English cricketer
- Peter Trower (1930–2017), Canadian poet and novelist
- Robin Trower (born 1945), English rock guitarist and vocalist with Procol Harum during the 1960s
- Ross H. Trower (1922–2014), rear admiral and Chief of Chaplains of the United States Navy
- Tandy Trower, CEO of a robotics company and former Microsoft engineer and software developer
- Walter Trower (1804–1877), Anglican bishop
- William Trower (born 1959), British barrister, justice of the High Court of England and Wales

== See also ==
- William B. Trower Bayshore Natural Area Preserve, Natural Area Preserve in Northampton County, Virginia
- Trowers & Hamlins, a law firm
- Robert Trowers (born 1957), American jazz trombonist
