= Charles Sandford =

Charles Sandford may refer to:

- Charles Sandford (politician) (1895–1966), Australian politician
- Charles W. Sandford (1796–1878), American militia and artillery officer, lawyer and businessman
- Charles Sandford (bishop) (1828–1903), Bishop of Gibraltar
