= Eggar's School =

Location
- London Road; Alton, Hampshire, Hampshire; England; 51.16027°N 0.95895°W

Information
- Type: Comprehensive; Academy
- Motto: Sero Sed Serie (Late, but in earnest)
- Established: 1642; 384 years ago
- Founder: John Eggar
- Department for Education URN: 138720 Tables
- Ofsted: Reports
- Head teacher: Sarah Holman
- Gender: Coeducational
- Age: 11 to 16
- Enrolment: 850
- Website: www.eggars.net

Eggar's School is a co-educational secondary school with academy status, located in the town of Alton, Hampshire, England.

== Founding and history ==
In 1640 John Eggar of Moungomeries founded the Free Grammar School, Alton which subsequently became known as Eggars Grammar School. The School Badge displays the date 1642.

The Eggar family have been associated with the area for many centuries. They were great hop growers and Richard Eggar was credited, in 1890, with the invention of the "rolling floor" to ease the drying process in the kilns.

=== Grammar school ===
Between 1640 - 1975 entrance to the Grammar School was largely based on the results of the eleven-plus examination. Pupils from other schools were able to transfer to the Sixth Form at the Grammar School after their O-levels (GCSE) though many chose to go to the Technical Colleges in Petersfield, Winchester, Farnborough and Guildford. This school occupied a site at Anstey Road, Alton until 1969, when it moved to a new site on London Road, Holybourne, Alton.

=== Comprehensive school ===
In 1975 the school became a comprehensive school, accessible to all children from the area.

=== Academy ===
The school converted to academy status on 1 September 2012.

== Current site ==
The current site for Eggar's School has been used since 1969. The earlier, partly 18th century, building is still standing and was retained for use by Eggars in the 1970s and then Amery Hill School in the 1980s and has now been converted into flats. There are approximately 900 students currently on roll.

== Academic performance ==
In 2010, the cohort achieved a 93% 5 A*-C pass rate in GCSEs, with 73% gaining 5 A*-C including English and Mathematics. These results are up 9% and 15% from 2009 respectively. The performance rate remains close to this figure year on year.

== Notable former pupils ==
- Yvette Cooper, Labour MP since 1997 for Normanton, Pontefract and Castleford; current Foreign Secretary; former Home Secretary; and wife of Labour former MP Ed Balls
- Chris Wright currently plays for Leicestershire County cricket team. Attended Eggar’s School from 1996. A pace bowler who made his name with Warwickshire.

=== Eggar's Grammar School ===
- Sandra Gidley, Liberal Democrat MP for Romsey (2000-2010), former Shadow Health spokesperson
- David Hughes (novelist) (1930–2005)
- Paddy Kingsland, musician, composer of many BBC TV programme themes
- Rt Rev Geoffrey Rowell, Bishop of Gibraltar in Europe since 2001
- Godfrey Smith (journalist) (1926–2017), editor from 1965-72 of the Sunday Times magazine

== See also ==
- List of the oldest schools in the United Kingdom
