= Arthur L. Collins =

British mine manager (1868–1902)

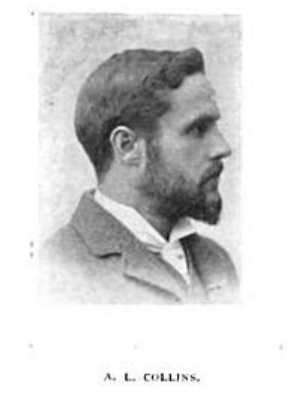
- Born: 8 July 1868; Truro, Cornwall, England
- Died: 21 November 1902 (aged 34); Telluride, Colorado
- Cause of death: Assassinated by unknown gunman
- Occupations: metallurgist & mine owner
- Spouse: Margaret M. G. Becker
- Parent(s): Joseph Henry Collins and Frances Miriam Denny

Arthur Launcelot Collins (8 July 1868 – 22 November 1902) was a British metallurgist, mining engineer and mine manager of properties in Mexico and the United States. He was born 8 July 1868 in Truro, Cornwall, England, the son of a prominent mining expert, Joseph Henry Collins, and brother of Henry, George, and Edgar Collins and William Collins, the Bishop of Gibraltar. Joseph H. Collins founded, and with his sons Henry, Arthur, and George, operated J. H. Collins & Sons, Mining and Metallurgical Engineers, an international mining consulting business headquartered in London, England.

When he was 15 years of age, Arthur Collins traveled with his father and brothers Henry and George to Andalusia, Spain, in the great mining region of Rio Tinto, where Joseph Collins was appointed chief chemist and assayer of the Peña del Hierro copper mine. Under his father, Arthur began his practical work in the laboratory and continued his studies in chemistry and mineralogy, and was soon employed as assayer and underground surveyor by the Peninsular Copper Co., in Southern Spain. Joseph H. Collins and his sons returned to England in 1885, where Arthur was put in charge of an experimental smelting works near Breage, in Cornwall.

In 1886, Arthur was appointed as assayer and chemist at the Berkeland zinc mine, near Stavanger, Norway. It was here that he erected his first concentrating mill. For the next few years he was engaged as a partner in the firm of J. H. Collins & Sons, examining and investing in mines around the world, including in Burma, Norway, Spain, Australia, Tasmania, and Mexico. In 1892 he was appointed geologist and mining engineer to the Amir of Afghanistan, and spent a year traveling in the region.

In early 1894, Arthur and his brother George left England to manage mine holdings in Central City and Georgetown, Colorado, as stockholders and consulting engineers for the Gold Coin Mines Company of New York. In the following year Arthur married Marguerite Morton Becker, the daughter of Gilpin County Judge Clayton F. Becker.

At age 31, Arthur Collins became general manager of the Smuggler-Union Mining Company which was a significant silver mine near Telluride in San Miguel County, Colorado. While the Smuggler-Union was a major producer in the district, its output consisted of low-grade ore.

== Increasing efficiency in the Smuggler-Union Mine ==
In order to increase profits, Collins ended the shift fireboss positions in the mine. He also introduced the "old Cornish system" of mining, which he was familiar with from his native Cornwall. It was referred to as the "contract system," or "fathoms," and essentially turned mining into piecework. The system became a point of contention between the Smuggler-Union Company and Telluride's Local 63 of the Western Federation of Miners, which complained that the wider the vein of ore, the lower a miner's wages would be. But Arthur Collins had little use for the union, and declared that there was nothing to arbitrate.

== The Western Federation of Miners calls a strike in Telluride ==
One of the miners in the Smuggler-Union was Vincent St. John, a young, inspirational man who had become the leader of the local union. St. John patiently tried to convince Collins to bargain over the issue of contracts, but Collins refused. On 1 May 1901, 350 miners walked off the job at the Smuggler-Union. The strike was under way.

Collins began to hire gunmen to protect the Smuggler-Union property, and he eventually brought in replacement workers. The gunmen harassed and tried to intimidate union men, while the union miners sought to persuade the strike breakers to stop working and join the strike.

=== Violence during the strike ===
In the middle of May 1901, the Telluride Daily Journal, a local newspaper hostile to the union, reprinted a story from a neighboring community, the Ouray Herald. It was an inflammatory story attributed to 27-year-old John Barthell, one of the striking miners. In the report, Barthell stated that the striking miners were highgraders, or ore thieves, and that they had called the strike in revenge after they had been caught. But Barthell was a faithful union man and the story was untrue.

On 3 July 1901, Barthell, a native of Finland, stepped to the front of the picket line, faced company gunmen, and shouted in broken English, "You are under arrest." The company gunmen immediately shot him through the neck and he fell, mortally wounded. Striking miners began to return fire, and a general shooting war broke out.

St. John quickly left Telluride to go to the site of the shooting as soon as he heard about it. He brokered a cease-fire with Edgar Collins, the brother of Arthur Collins, and the company agreed to close down the mine for three days.

=== The strike is settled without further violence ===
Anti-union business and community leaders called upon Governor Orman to send in the Colorado Volunteer Militia, but Lieutenant Governor David Coates persuaded him to allow for negotiations instead. The negotiations were successful, with Vincent St. John and Arthur Collins compromising over the issue of contracts. The district experienced 16 months of labor peace after the agreement.

== Tragedy again strikes the Smuggler-Union Mine ==
On 20 November 1901, Arthur Collins was out of the country and his brother was in charge. A fire started in the Smuggler-Union outbuildings, and fed poisonous smoke into the mine tunnels. Twenty-four miners and mine foremen, both union and non-union, died. Vincent St. John arrived on the scene and, in the absence of any effective response by management, was credited with directing rescue efforts, including entering the smoke-filled mine at serious risk to his own health. St. John was credited with saving lives.

In the aftermath of the fire, the company was criticized for failing to respond effectively. Arthur Collins's decision to eliminate the fireboss positions, and his practice of promoting non-union men with less experience, was considered a significant factor in management's early, fumbling response.

== Colorado mine owners join forces ==
In March 1902, Arthur Collins and other mine operators formed the Colorado Mine Operators' Association. Twenty-seven members started the group, many of them from Idaho Springs, where the WFM was strong. The organization would play a significant role in the upcoming Colorado Labor Wars.

== Murder ==
On 19 November 1902, the eve of the anniversary of the great fire, Arthur Collins was mortally wounded with a shotgun blast through the window of the house on the Smuggler-Union property. There were many who accused the union, but others declared that with a contract in place and relative cooperation, the union had no motive for the attack. Others considered the possibility that the murder was committed as revenge for the men killed in the fire one year earlier.

Arthur Collins was replaced as the Smuggler-Union general manager by Bulkeley Wells.
