= Joseph Henry Collins =

English mining engineer (1841–1916)

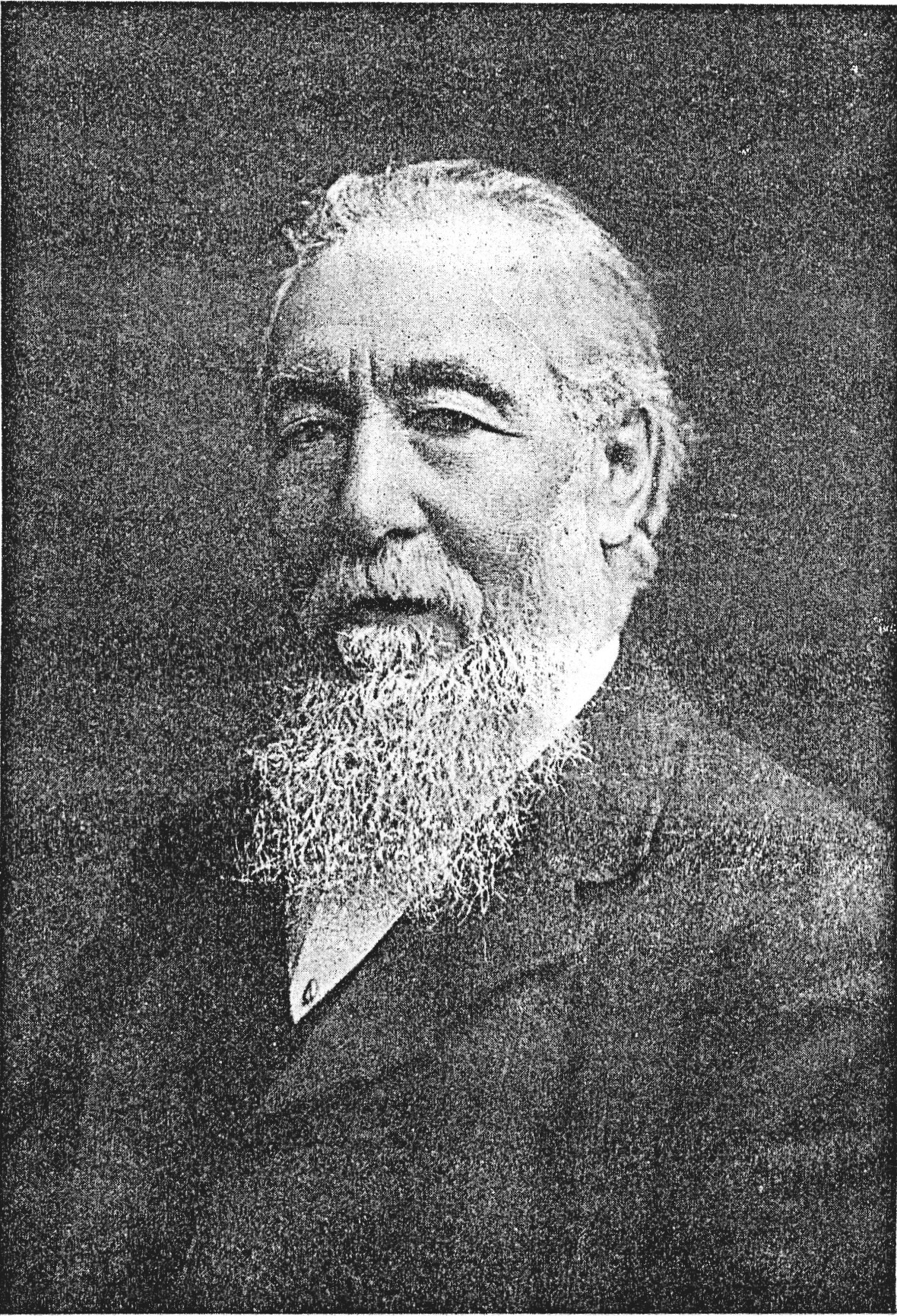
- Born: 16 March 1841; London, England
- Died: 12 April 1916 (aged 75); Crinnis, Cornwall, England
- Awards: Bolitho Medal of the RGSC, 1898
- Scientific career
- Fields: Geology, Mining engineering, Mineralogy
- Workplaces: RGSC, RCPS, RIC, The Miners Association, IMM, Geological Society

Joseph Henry Collins FGS (16 March 1841 – 12 April 1916) was an influential English mining engineer, mineralogist and geologist.

== Career ==
Collins was educated at The Working Men's College and Birkbeck College, London.

He was at various times the Secretary or President of the three learned societies of Cornwall – Royal Geological Society of Cornwall (President from 1903–1904, and 1911–1912), the Royal Cornwall Polytechnic Society, and the Royal Institution of Cornwall. He contributed significantly to the Transactions of the Royal Geological Society of Cornwall, and was awarded the Bolitho Medal by the RGSC in 1898.

He was the founding Secretary of the Mineralogical Society of Great Britain and Ireland in 1876 and was involved in founding the Institution of Mining and Metallurgy, becoming its Vice-President in 1892. He also lectured for, and was secretary of, The Miners Association of Cornwall and Devon, succeeding Sir Clement Le Neve Foster in 1867.

Collins pioneered systematic exploration for china clay in the St Austell area, and had a long association with the area, as well as introducing both the filter press and the monitor to the china clay industry. From 1881–1884 he was the chief chemist and metallurgist for Rio Tinto mines in Spain but left due to ill health, possibly malaria. He died at his home in Crinnis, near St Austell, on 12 April 1916 and is buried in nearby Campdowns cemetery.

== Issue and legacy ==
He married Frances Miriam Denny in 1863, and had five sons and four daughters.

His sons included Arthur L. Collins, a mine manager who was murdered in America, and William Edward Collins, Bishop of Gibraltar in Europe.

His daughter Helen Miriam Stuart Collins married in 1912 The Rev. Reginald Frederick Moody, who was the youngest son of the clergyman James Leith Moody.

He died at his home, Crinnis House, near St Austell, on 12 April 1916, and is buried in the nearby Campdowns cemetery, Charlestown. A memorial was erected by the Mineralogical Society on 10 June 2005 at St Paul's Church, Charlestown.

In 2008, the Mineralogical Society established a new annual award, The Collins Medal, to recognise the lifetime contributions of scientists to pure or applied aspects of Mineral Sciences and associated studies. The Collins medal was first awarded in 2010, to Dr Henry Emeleus.

== Selected publications ==
- A Handbook to the Mineralogy of Cornwall and Devon, 1871
- Principals of Metal Mining, 1874
- Mineralogy, 1877
- The Hensbarrow Granite District, 1878, republished 1992, ISBN 0-9519419-1-7
