= St. John the Evangelist's Anglican Church, İzmir =

St. John the Evangelist Church, İzmir
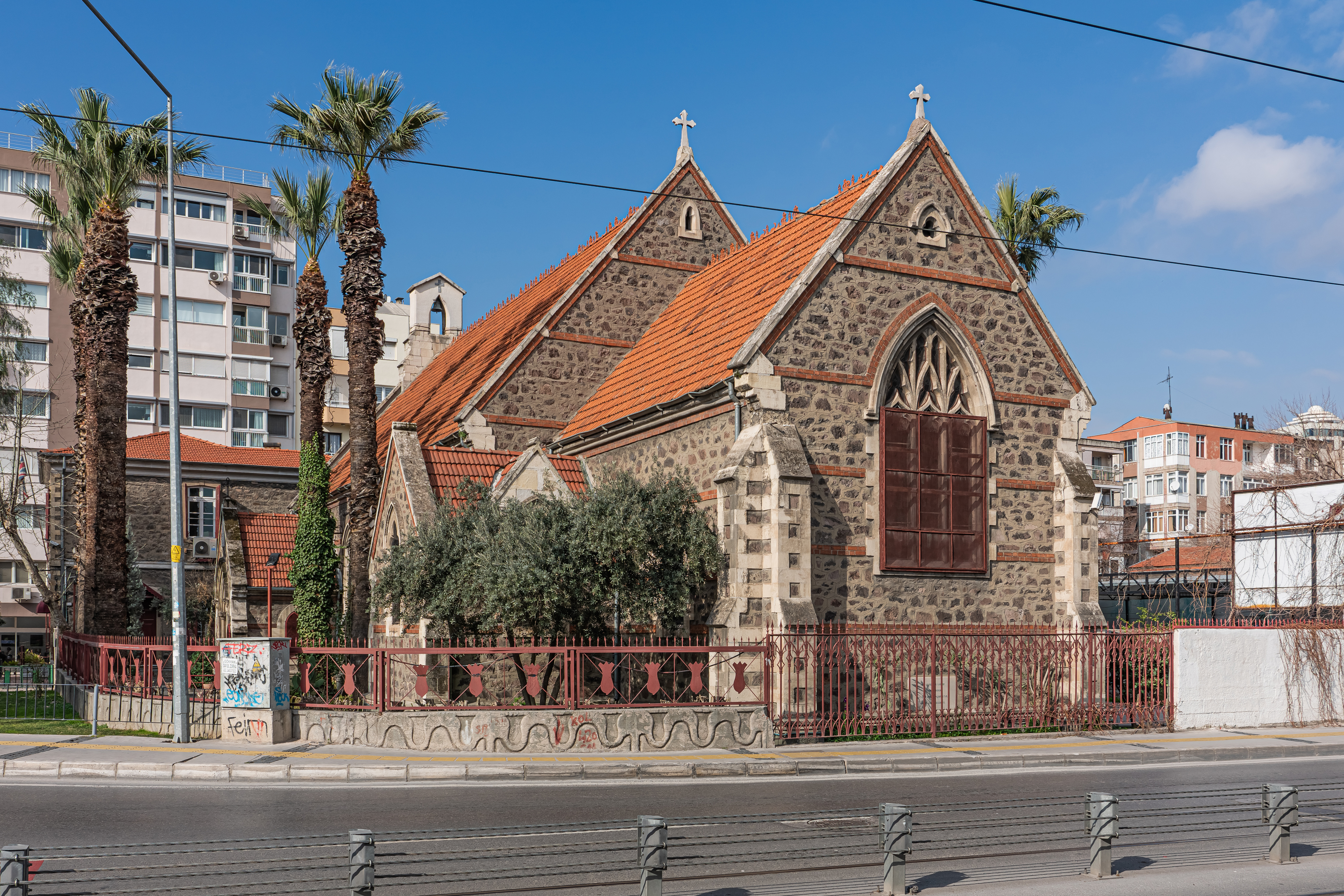
- St. John the Evangelist Church, İzmir
- 38°26′13.4″N 27°08′50.2″E
- Country: Turkey
- Denomination: Church of England
- Churchmanship: Anglo-Catholic
- Website: Official website

History
- Consecrated: 1899

Architecture
- Functional status: Active
- Architectural type: Church
- Style: Gothic Revival

Administration
- Diocese: Gibraltar in Europe
- Archdeaconry: Eastern Archdeaconry

The Anglican Church of St. John the Evangelist, also known simply as St. John's, is located in İzmir, Turkey, in the quarter of Alsancak.

== History ==
John mentions Smyrna, the modern İzmir, in Revelations 2:8-11 and one of his disciples, Polycarp, who is depicted in one of the stained glass windows of the church became bishop of Smyrna. The church shares its name with the catholic cathedral of İzmir.

The church was built in 1898-1899. St John's was consecrated by Bishop Charles Sandford (Bishop of Gibraltar) on 7 April 1902. However, the first Church of England chaplain (Thomas Curtys) was posted to Smyrna in 1636 and there has been a constant presence of an Anglican chaplain in the city ever since.

On 22 March 1911, William Collins, the Bishop of Gibraltar, died on board the SS Saghalien en route from Constantinople to Smyrna and was subsequently buried in the church.

The New Zealander Charles Dobson (1886–1930) was Chaplain of St. John's during the Great fire of Smyrna in 1922; he escaped the burning city with his wife and two small daughters and later became a key witness in the trial about the origins of the fire.

The current chaplain is The Revd James Buxton, formerly Dean of Chapel of Corpus Christi College, Cambridge, who was appointed as Chaplain of St. John’s İzmir and Mission to Seafarers Port Chaplain to İzmir on 18 September 2017.

== Architecture ==
The church was built in a neo-Gothic architectural style. The architect was Mr S. Watkins, Engineer of the Ottoman Railway Company, a British company which was at that time constructing a railway line from Smyrna to Aydin. The floor of the church is supported by pieces of railway line placed vertically in the crypt.

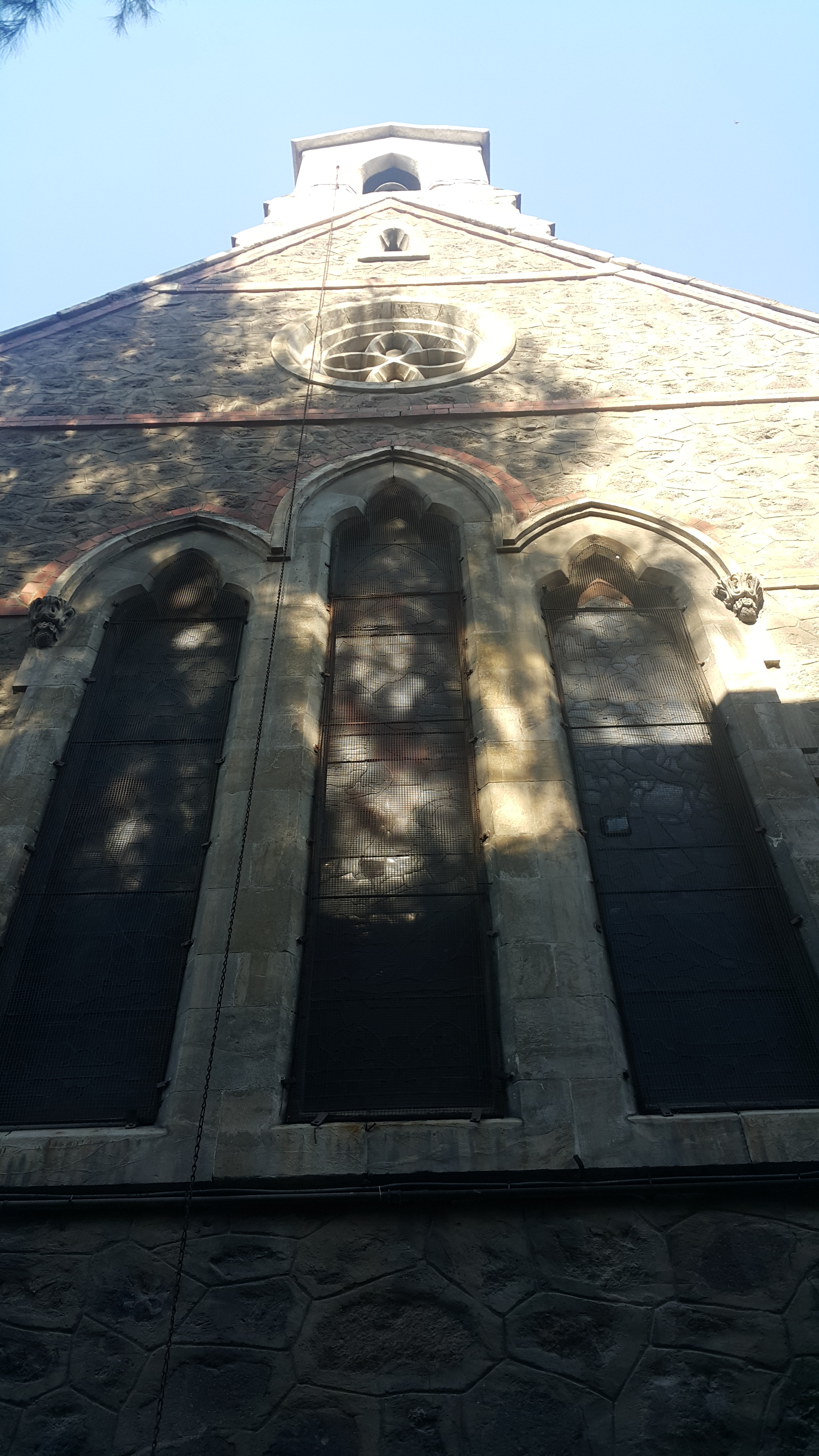
St. John the Evangelist's Anglican, rose window and west façade

=== Exterior ===
The exterior design is also neo-Gothic. On the west façade, there is a little rose window. Also on that façade there is a spire. Under the rose window, there are three stained-glass windows, behind iron barriers. On the north façade there are small flying buttresses.

==== Stained-Glass Windows ====
The back (west) window was made in Germany in 1895. The front (east) window was made in 1904 by Charles Kempe and includes a small panel showing Ignatius of Antioch on his way to martyrdom, being greeted in Smyrna by St. Polycarp, bishop of Smyrna, who kisses the martyr's chains.

=== Interior ===
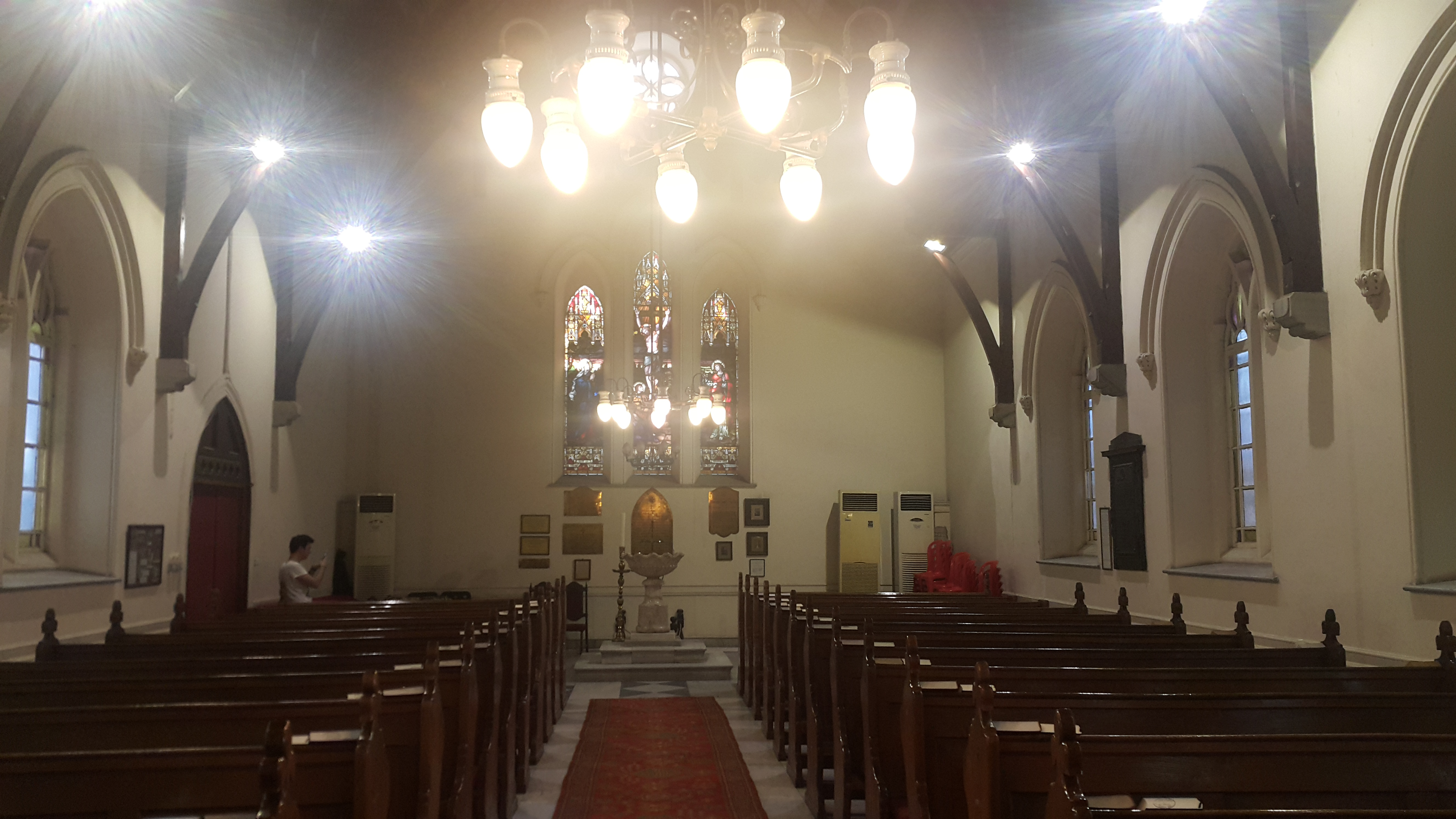
St. John the Evangelist's Anglican Church Interior

Inside of the church, the grave of William Edward Collins, Bishop of Gibraltar is on the left of the entrance, to the west. There is a baptismal font next to the grave, in the shape of a seashell, an ancient symbol of Christian pilgrimage. Behind that is the rose window. At the other end of the church, faced by the pews, is the altar, below three of the stained-glass windows.

== Surroundings ==
The Bishop Collins Memorial Hall was erected in 1913 and is used as a multi-purpose facility. The Sunday School meets in the hall and the hall and kitchen are used every Sunday for after service fellowship and tea time, as well as for various meetings and events. The church office is next to the fellowship hall. A vicarage was built next to the church in 1911 and is now leased to the British Government for use as the Consulate.

== Worship ==
St. John's is liturgically Anglo-Catholic by tradition with the use of vestments and a traditional hymnal, weekly communion is practiced incorporating official Church of England use of liturgy.

== Notable burials ==
- William Collins (bishop) (1867–1911), the Anglican Bishop of Gibraltar

== Gallery ==
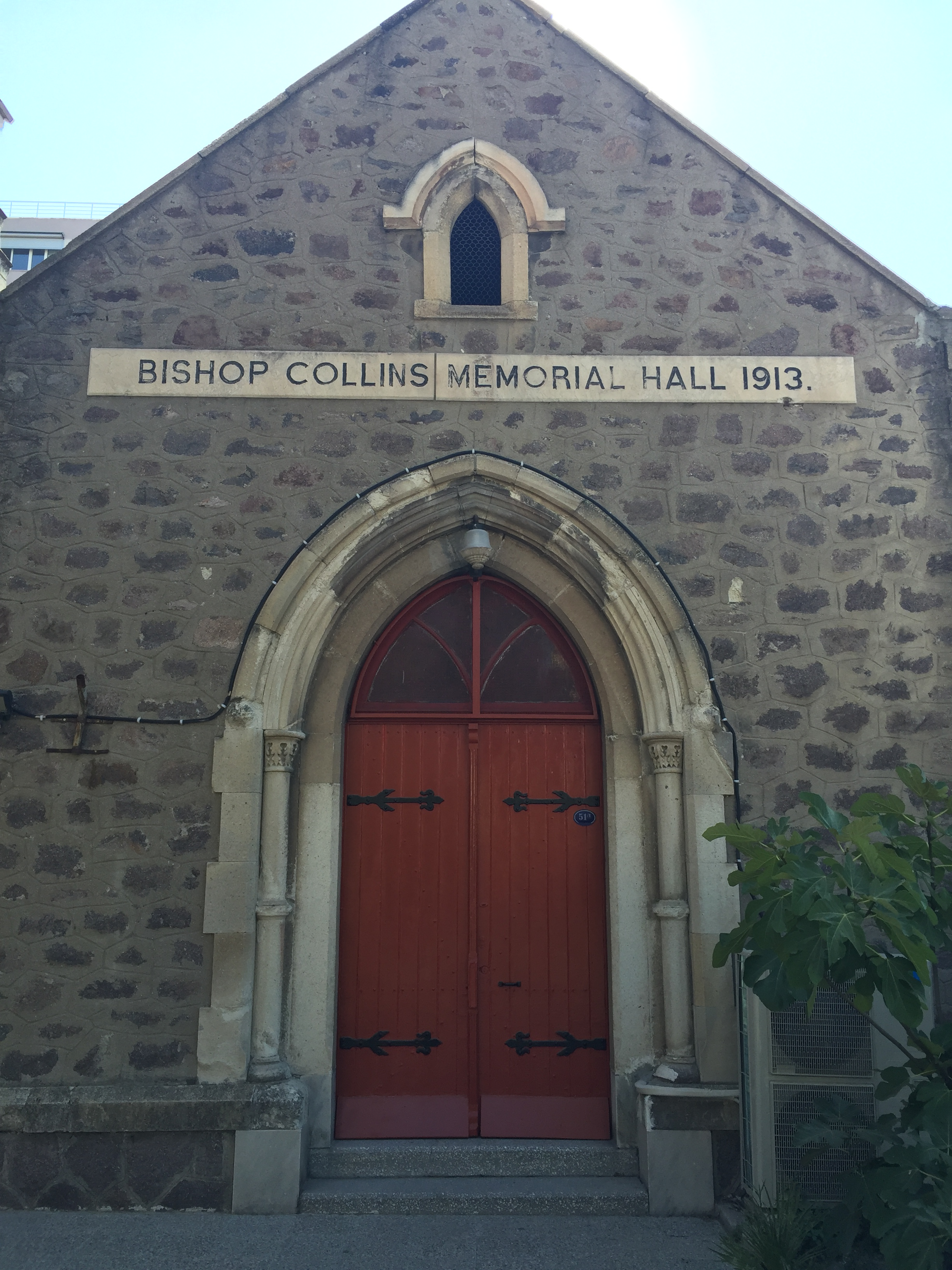
Bishop Collins Memorial Hall

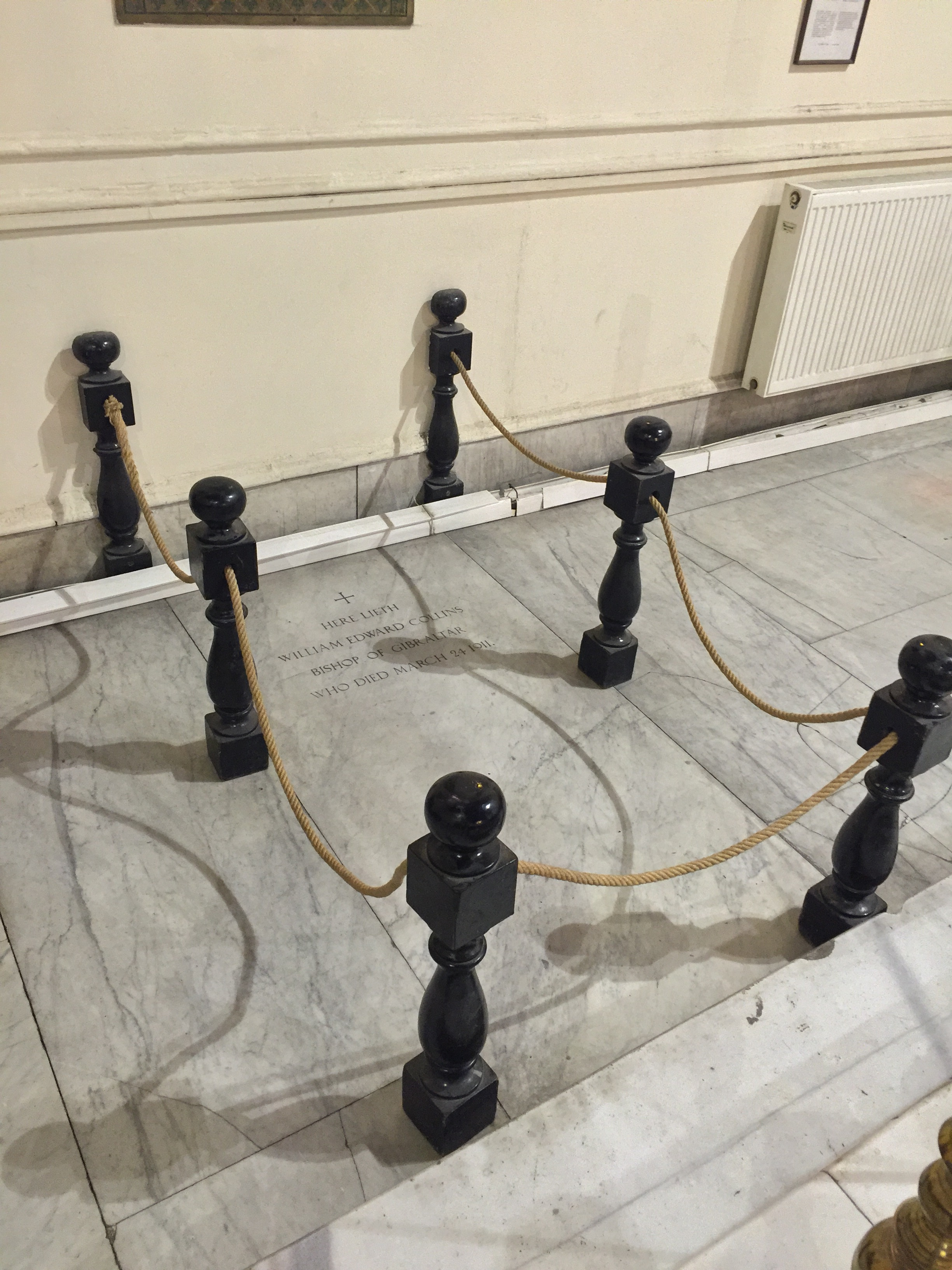
The grave of William Edward Collins, Bishop of Gibraltar

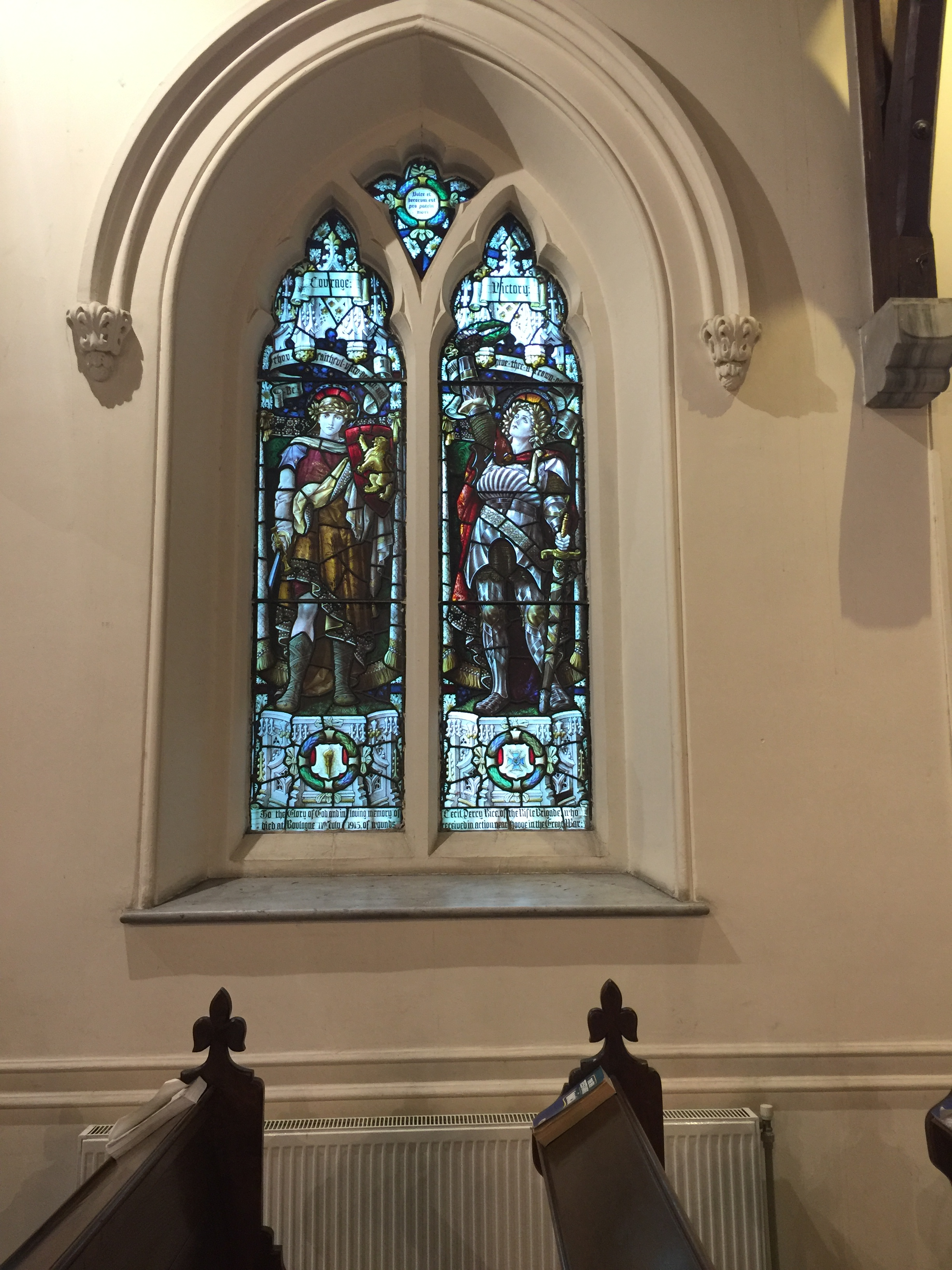
One of the stained glass windows in the church

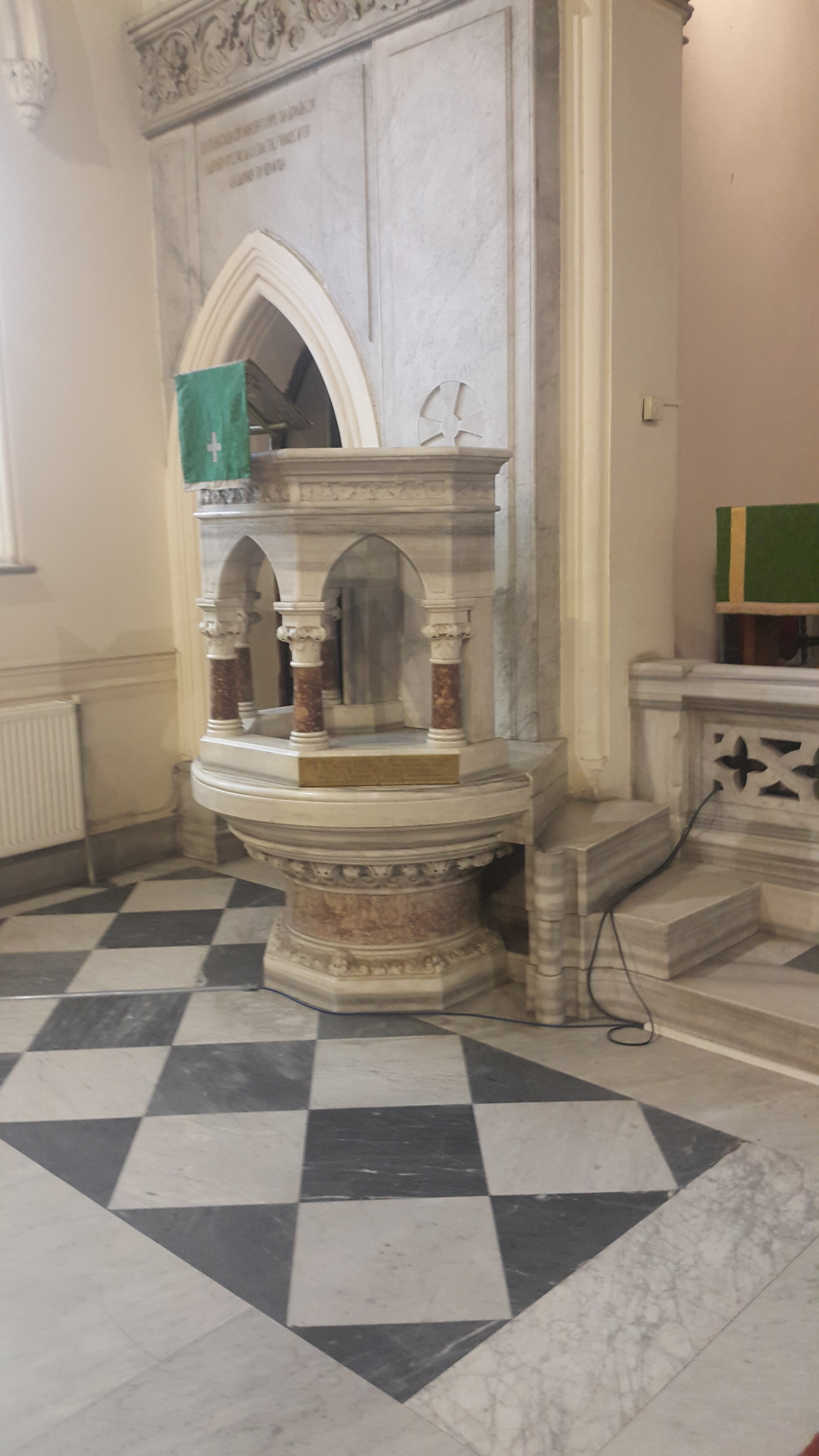
A view of the church pulpit

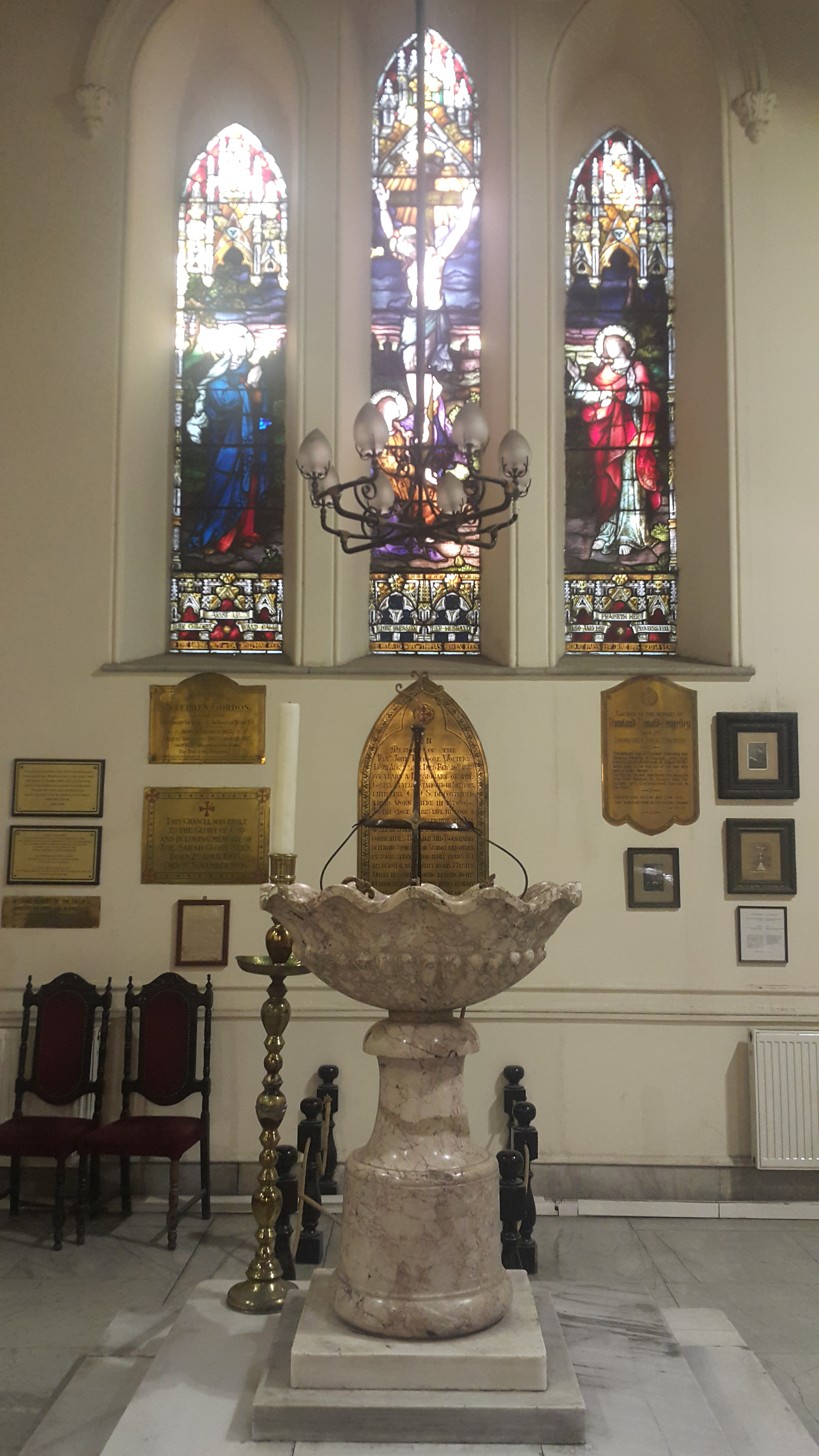
The baptismal font, in the shape of a seashell

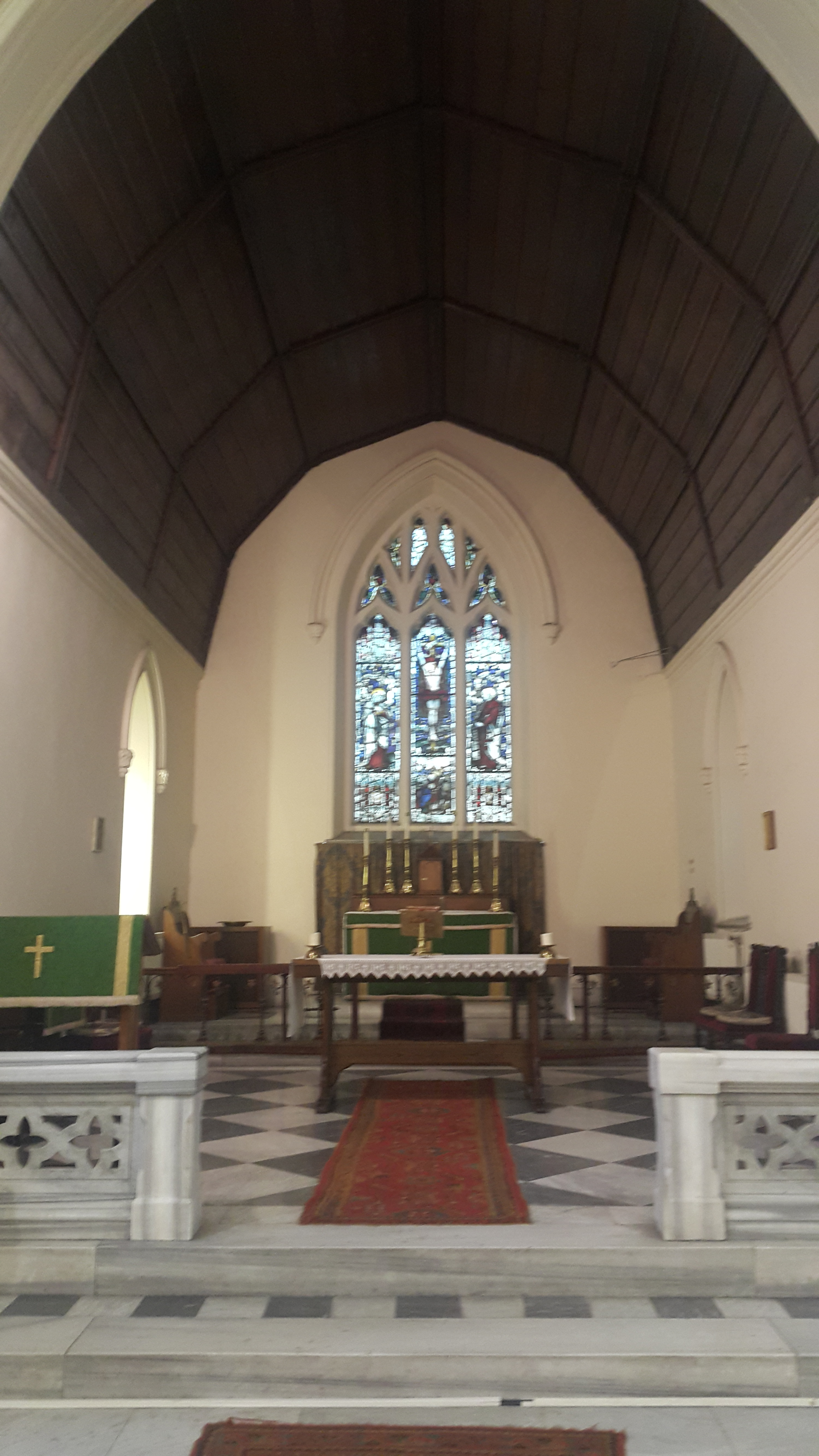
The altar, beneath stained glass windows

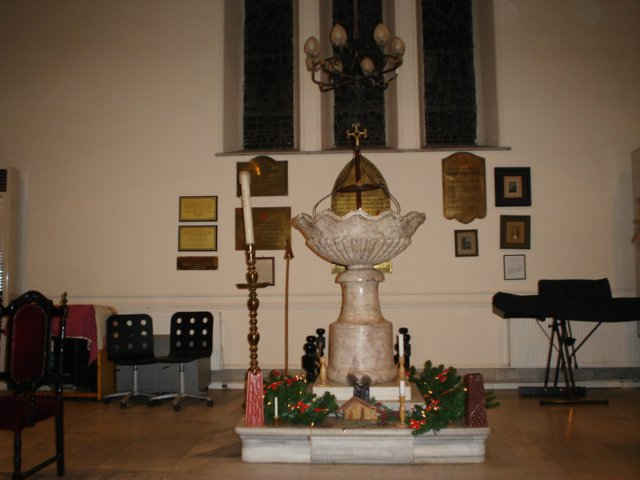
The baptismal font of the church

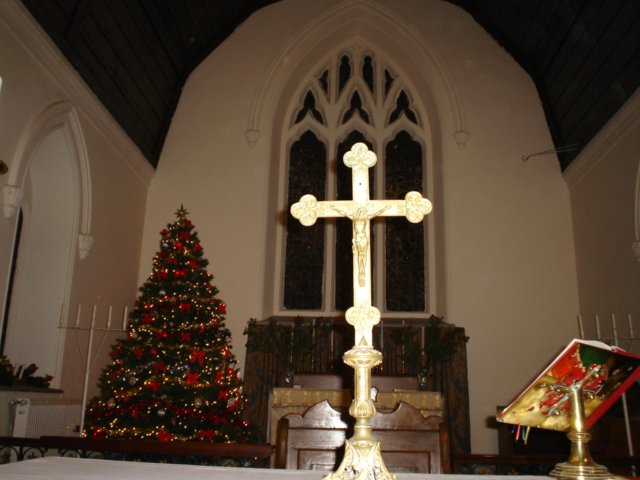
The altar crucifix

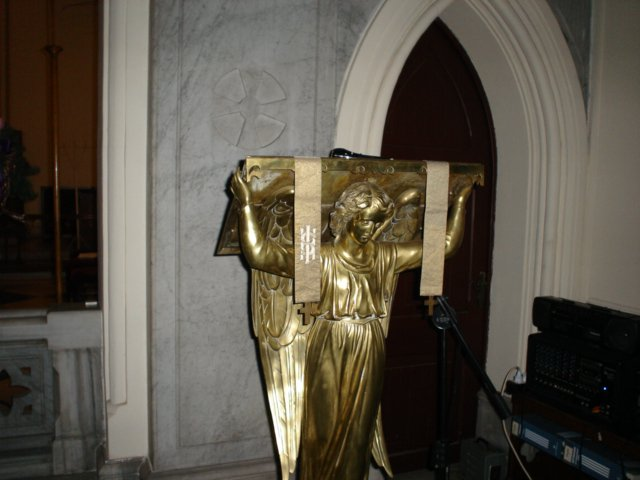
Angel Lectern

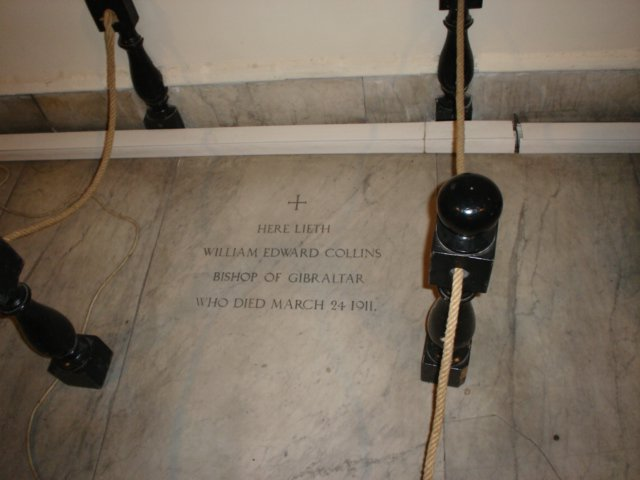
The grave epitaph of William Edward Collins, Bishop of Gibraltar
