= The Sunday Times Magazine =

Publication of The Sunday Times of London

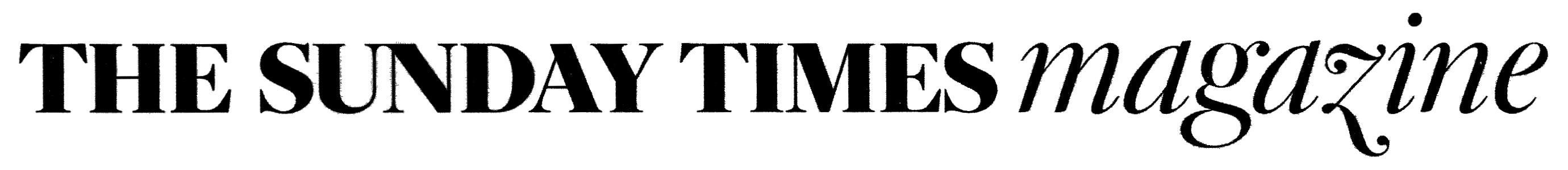

- Cover of The Sunday Times Magazine (15 December 2016), with Australian singer Kylie Minogue
- Editor: Martin Hemming
- Categories: Newspaper supplement
- Frequency: Weekly
- Circulation: 904,548 (print) and 125,116 (digital) as part of The Sunday Times
- Founded: 1962
- Company: Times Newspapers Ltd
- Country: United Kingdom
- Based in: London
- Language: English
- Website: thetimes.com
- ISSN: 0956-1382

The Sunday Times Magazine is a magazine included with The Sunday Times. In 1962 it became the first colour supplement to be published as a supplement to a UK newspaper, and its arrival "broke the mould of weekend newspaper publishing".

The magazine publishes long-form journalism and photography on a wide range of subjects. Its contributors have included authors, photographers, and artists from various countries.

== History ==
The first edition of The Sunday Times Colour Section was published on 4 February 1962, and included some significant harbingers of the Swinging Sixties. These included 11 photographs on the cover of Jean Shrimpton wearing a Mary Quant dress, photographed by David Bailey, and a new James Bond story by Ian Fleming, entitled "The Living Daylights" – a title that would be used for a Bond film 25 years later.

The publication subsequently changed its title to The Sunday Times Colour Magazine, and was modified shortly afterwards to The Sunday Times Magazine.

The first editor was Mark Boxer; subsequent editors included Godfrey Smith, Magnus Linklater, Hunter Davies, Ron Hall, Philip Clarke, Robin Morgan and Sarah Baxter. The present editor is Martin Hemming.

The magazine has published lengthy and detailed articles on major events, from the Great Train Robbery to 9/11, from Beatlemania to Britart, and from the 1969 Moon landing to the 2012 London Olympic Games. From the outset, "photographer first" was the benchmark and required serious investment in photo-reportage from the world's trouble spots. Michael Rand, its art director for 30 years from 1962, said the credo was "grit plus glamour – fashion juxtaposed with war photography and pop art". He went on to champion the work of such photographers as Terry O'Neill, Brian Duffy, Richard Avedon, Eugene Richards, Diane Arbus, Mary Ellen Mark. The magazine featured images from the Vietnam War by the photographer Don McCullin, a photo-essay on the Vatican by Eve Arnold, many portraits and photo-essays by Lord Snowdon, and Bert Stern's final photoshoot with Marilyn Monroe, among many other photographic collections.

The magazine's weekly columnists have included Jilly Cooper, Zoë Heller and Daisy Waugh and its best known cover artists have included Sir Peter Blake, David Hockney, Alan Aldridge and Ian Dury. Since 1977, the magazine has published the column "A Life In The Day", which has revealed intimate everyday details via interviews with many prominent people, including Nelson Mandela, Muhammad Ali, Paul McCartney, Nancy Dell'Olio, Muammar Gaddafi, Kate Winslet and Celine Dion.

Recent highlights in the magazine have included David James Smith's account of the 9/11 victims who jumped from the World Trade Center ("The Fallen"), for which Smith won Features Reporter of the Year at the British Press Awards for 2011; Lynn Barber's 2010 interview with the writer Christopher Hitchens; and John Arlidge's 2009 interview with Lloyd Blankfein, chairman and CEO of Goldman Sachs.

In 1990 the magazine established the Ian Parry Scholarship, in order to encourage young photographers and help them to undertake the assignments of their choice. The scholarship was created in honour of Ian Parry, who was killed in Romania in 1989, at the age of 24, while on assignment for the magazine. Prizes are still awarded annually to winning entrants.

In December 2010, the magazine became viewable on the Apple iPad, and in February 2012 it celebrated its 50th anniversary. It now has a print circulation of almost 1 million, and nearly 69 million digital page views were recorded in April 2012.

== Special editions ==
The Sunday Times Magazine has published many special editions, with subjects ranging across politics, the arts, science and sport. Subjects have included the Beatles, the Olympic Games, James Bond, and the Star Wars film franchise. On 5 February 2012, the magazine published a special edition to celebrate 50 years of publication, which included the feature "Makers & Shakers 1962–2012", for which The Sunday Times editors and experts selected "the 50 most influential Britons of the past 50 years". On 19 August 2012, an 82-page photographic souvenir edition of the magazine was published to celebrate the 2012 Olympic Games in London.

== Exhibitions ==
The exhibition Cover Story: The Art and Photojournalism of The Sunday Times Magazine – with selected covers from the publication between 1962 and 2006 – was mounted at Proud Camden, London, in September and October 2006.

The magazine held its 50th-anniversary exhibition at the Saatchi Gallery in February 2012. The show attracted 200,000 people, and its duration was extended three times. It was described by one critic as "a welcome celebration of the power of print journalism".

The Ian Parry Scholarship Exhibition is held every summer, showing the work of winning and commended photographers.
