= William Collins (bishop) =

19th and 20th-century Anglican bishop

The Right Reverend William Edward Collins
- Bishop of Gibraltar
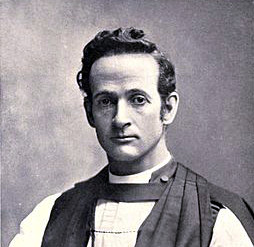
- Predecessor: Charles Sandford
- Successor: Henry Knight

Personal details
- Born: 18 February 1867 London, England
- Died: 24 March 1911 (aged 44) At sea
- Parents: Joseph Henry Collins and Frances Miriam Denny
- Occupation: Cleric

William Edward Collins (18 February 1867 – 24 March 1911) was an Anglican Bishop of Gibraltar from 1904 until his death in 1911.

== Biography ==
William Edward Collins was the second son of Joseph Henry Collins, a mining engineer. One of his brothers was the mining engineer Arthur L. Collins who was murdered in the United States. His sister Helen Miriam Stuart Collins married in 1912 The Rev. Reginald Frederick Moody, who was the youngest son of the clergyman James Leith Moody.

He was born in London, but his father moved to Cornwall while he was a child. He was educated at Nuttall's and Chancellor's schools in Truro, and at Selwyn College, Cambridge.

He was ordained in 1891 and began his career as a curate at All Hallows-by-the-Tower in the City of London.

After a short spell as a Lecturer at Selwyn College, Cambridge, he became Professor of Ecclesiastical History at King's College London where he remained until his elevation to the episcopate. He was consecrated as a bishop on the Feast of the Conversion of St Paul on 25 January 1904, at Westminster Abbey by Archbishop of Canterbury Randall Davidson. As Bishop of Gibraltar he worked from The Convent, which was the residence of the Governor of Gibraltar. He was also a Sub-Prelate of the Order of St John of Jerusalem.

He lived in Malta, and died on 24 March 1911 at sea. He is interred at the St. John the Evangelist's Anglican Church, İzmir, Turkey. His biography was written by Arthur James Mason.

== Notes ==
Church of England titles
Preceded by Charles Sandford	Bishop of Gibraltar in Europe; 1904–1911	Succeeded by Henry Knight
