= Nugent Hicks =

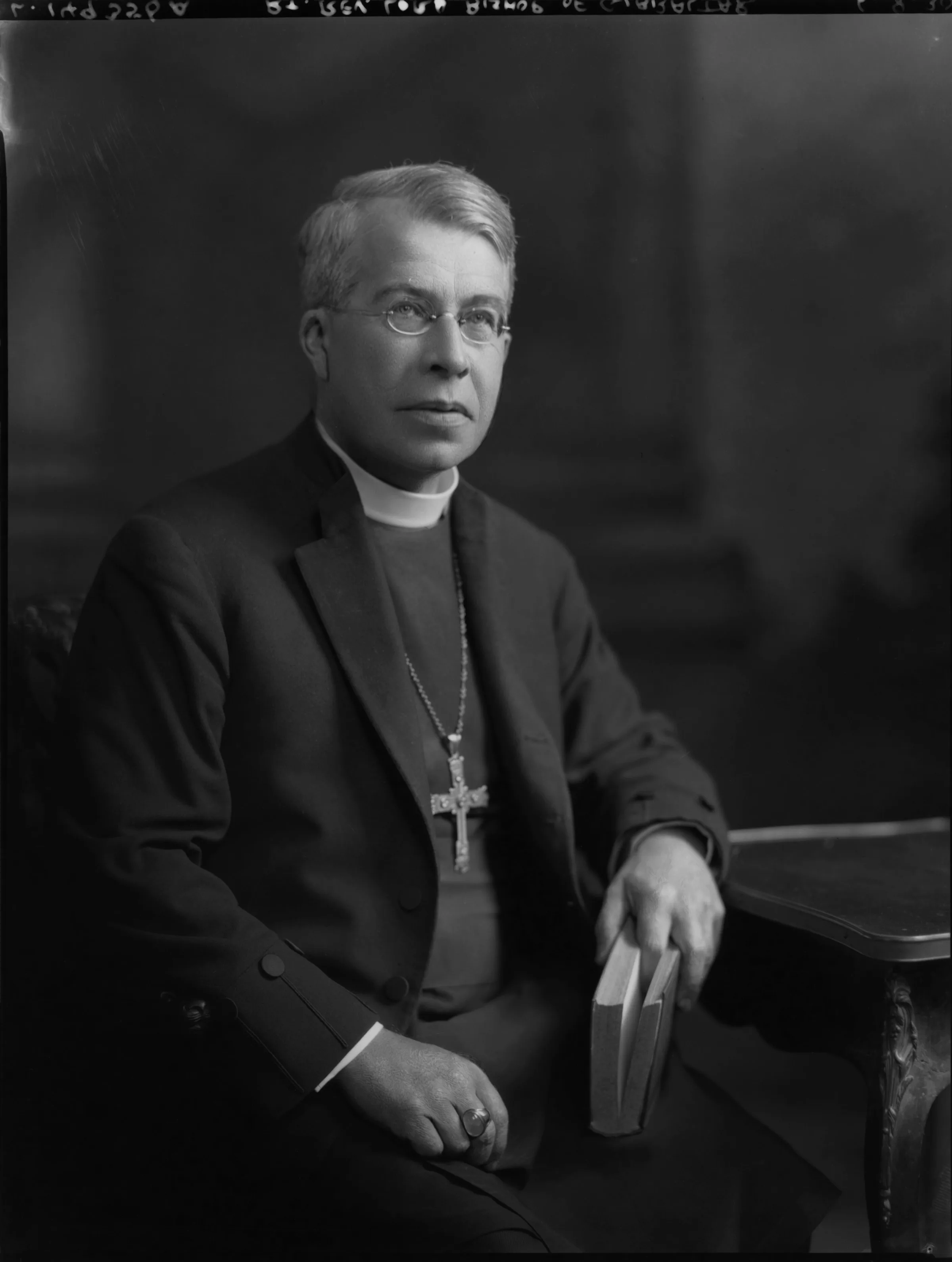
Hicks in 1930

Frederick Cyril Nugent Hicks (1872 – 10 February 1942) was a Church of England bishop and author who served as Bishop of Gibraltar from 1927 to 1933, and Bishop of Lincoln from 1933 to 1942.

== Life ==
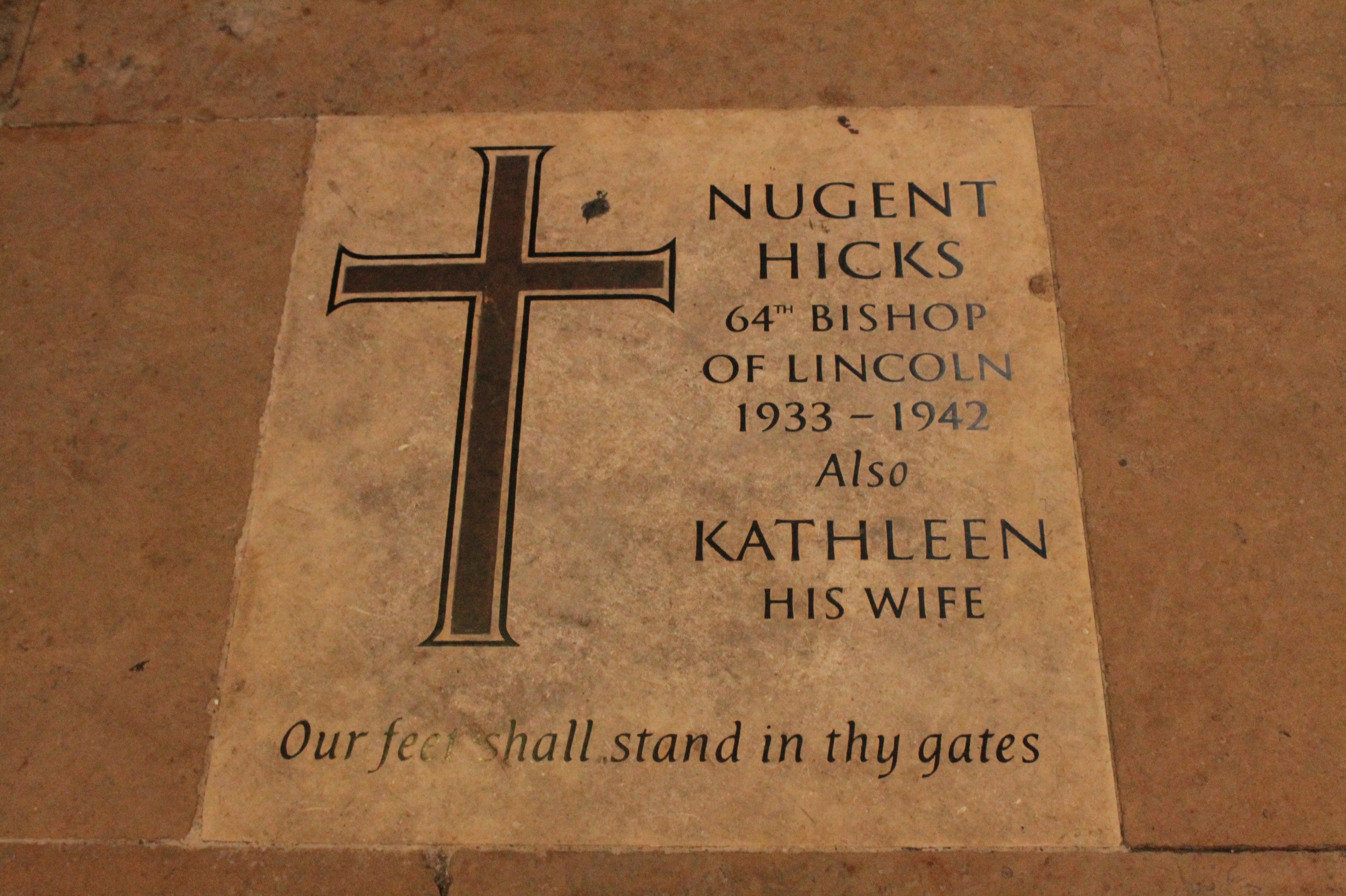
Memorial to Nugent Hicks at Lincoln Cathedral

Born on 28 June 1872, Hicks underwent early education at Wixenford School and Harrow. While at Harrow Winston Churchill was his fag. He attended Balliol College, Oxford, before his ordination in 1897. From then until 1909 he was successively Lecturer, Tutor, and Dean of Keble College, Oxford. In 1909 he was appointed Principal of Bishops’ College, Cheshunt, after which he was Rector of Toddington, West Sussex, and Rural Dean of Brighton, before his elevation to the episcopate. He served as Bishop of Gibraltar from 1927 to 1933, during which time he was appointed as Sub-Prelate of the Order of St John of Jerusalem. He was Bishop of Lincoln from 1933 to 1942.

Hicks was a Freemason under the jurisdiction of the United Grand Lodge of England. He was also a member of the Holy Royal Arch, the Ancient and Accepted Rite, and the Masonic Knights Templar. He rose to the most senior clerical position in the Knights Templar, on his appointment as Great Prelate in May 1941, but died the following year.

A memorial slab to his memory was placed in the floor of Lincoln Cathedral.

== Major publications ==
- Consecration Prayers (1908)
- The Fullness of Sacrifice (1930)

== Notes ==
Church of England titles
Preceded by John Harold Greig	Bishop of Gibraltar; 1927–1933	Succeeded by Harold Jocelyn Buxton
Preceded by William Shuckburgh Swayne	Bishop of Lincoln; 1933–1942	Succeeded by Alymer Skelton
