= Walter Trower =

English bishop

The Right Reverend Walter John Trower
- Bishop of Gibraltar
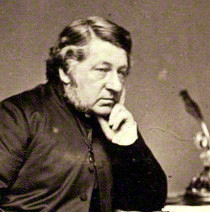
- Church: Church of England
- Diocese: Gibraltar
- In office: 1863-1868
- Predecessor: George Tomlinson
- Successor: Charles Harris
- Previous post: Bishop of Glasgow and Galloway (1848-1859)

Orders
- Ordination: 1832 by Charles Sumner
- Consecration: 21 September 1848 by William Skinner

Personal details
- Born: 5 April 1804 London, England
- Died: 24 October 1877 (aged 73)
- Denomination: Anglican
- Parents: John Trower, Jane James
- Spouse: Elizabeth Goring (m. 1829)
- Children: 3

Walter John Trower FRSE (5 April 1804 – 24 October 1877) was an Anglican bishop.

== Early life ==
He was born on 5 April 1804 in Hanover Square in London the son of John Trower and his first wife Jane James, daughter of Sir Walter James 1st Baronet. A younger half-brother was Charles Francis Trower. Around 1819/20 the family moved to Muntham Court at Findon, West Sussex. He studied divinity at Oxford University graduating BA in 1828 MA in 1829.

== Career ==
In 1829 he became deacon of Chichester, from 1830 to 1832 was curate at Cropredy and from 1832 was briefly a priest at Winchester before going to Petersfield and in 1834 going to Milland in Sussex. In 1839 he became rector of Wiston in Sussex.

Trower was Bishop of Glasgow and Galloway from 1848 to 1859. Elected by eight votes to seven, he was the first English cleric appointed to a Scottish bishopric who had not previously ministered in Scotland and therefore did not understand the traditions of the Scottish Episcopal Church. He condemned everything that seemed consistent with ritualistic developments of the Oxford Movement and publicly opposed the eucharistic teaching of Bishop Alexander Forbes of Brechin. For half of his time as bishop he was not resident in the diocese.

After a short period as sub-dean of Exeter Cathedral, he was the Bishop of Gibraltar from 1863 to 1868. He lived at the Bishop's Palace in Valletta on the island of Malta.

He gained some notoriety during the election of Frederick Temple as Bishop of Exeter when, on behalf of clergy who disapproved of Temple's role as a contributor to the controversial Essays and Reviews, he instructed counsel to oppose the confirmation of the nomination which took place at St Mary-le-Bow, Cheapside, in December 1869. The opposition was unsuccessful. Temple went on to become Archbishop of Canterbury in 1896.

He died aged 73 on 24 October 1877. A noted artist and author, two of his books have been republished in recent years.

== Family ==
In 1829 he was married to his childhood sweetheart Elizabeth Goring of Wiston House.They had three daughters: Jane, Frances and Mary.

== Publications ==
- Exposition of the Gospels and Epistles (1840)
- Similitudes of Holy Scripture (1848)

== Known art works ==
- General View of the Alhambra (1865)

Anglican Communion titles
Preceded by Michael Russell	Bishop of Glasgow and Galloway; 1848 – 1859	Succeeded by William Scot Wilson
Preceded by George Tomlinson	Bishop of Gibraltar; 1863 – 1868	Succeeded by Charles Amyand Harris
