= John Greig (bishop) =

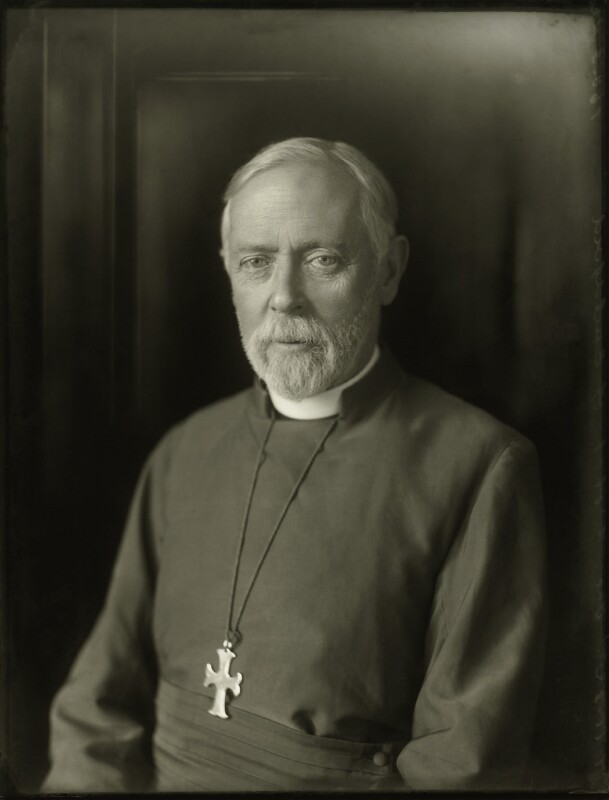
Greig in 1932

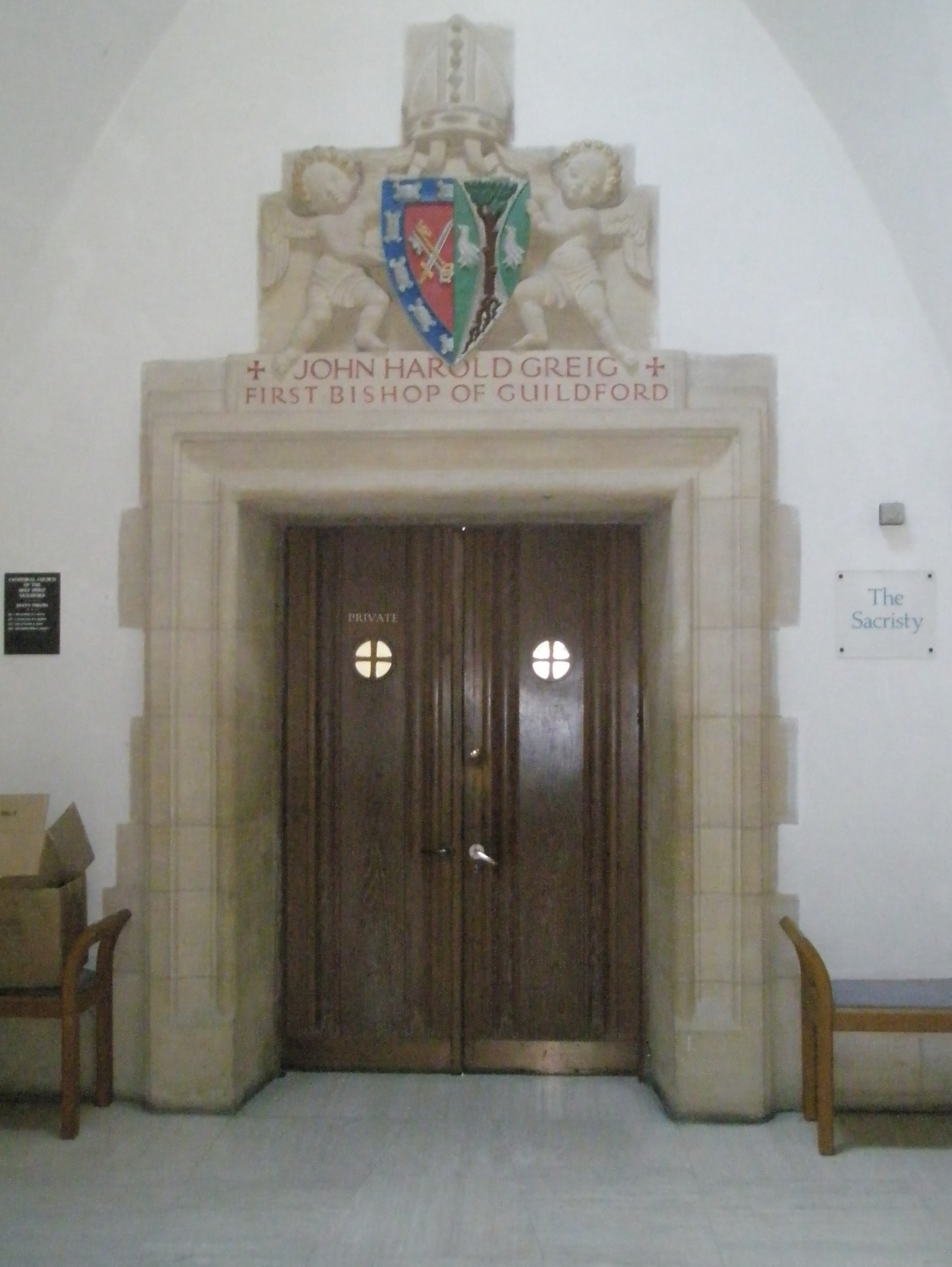
Memorial within Guildford Cathedral

John Harold Greig was Bishop of Gibraltar then Guildford in the first half of the 20th century. He was born on 13 February 1865 and educated at Pembroke College, Cambridge. He was ordained deacon in 1888 and priest a year later. After a curacy at St Bartholomew's, Sydenham he was Wilberforce Missioner in South London then Vicar of St Paul's, Lorrimore Square; and later became Archdeacon of Worcester before his elevation to the episcopate. He was consecrated a bishop by Randall Davidson, Archbishop of Canterbury, on the Feast of the Conversion of St Paul 1921 (25 January) at Westminster Abbey. He died on 28 March 1938.

== Notes ==
Church of England titles
| Preceded by Henry Joseph Corbett Knight | Bishop of Gibraltar; 1921 – 1927 | Succeeded by Frederick Cyril Nugent Hicks |
| Preceded by Inaugural appointment | Bishop of Guildford; 1927 – 1934 | Succeeded by John Victor Macmillan |
