= Order of St. David of Wales, St. Alban and St. Crescentino =

Anglican knightly religious order

The Order of St. David of Wales, St. Alban and St. Crescentino, also known as the Order of St. David, is an ecumenical knightly religious order of Anglican foundation, open to both clerical and lay knights.

== History ==
Established in 2007 by the Order's first Grand Master, Geoffrey Rowell, the Order's objective is to support dialogue between religions, carry out charitable and cultural activities. Mainly the Order expanded in Italy starting from the Church of Ognissanti in Rome. At the beginning of 2017, thanks to the research of some knights of the Order, a relic belonging to Sant'Albano, one of the patron saints of the Order, was found in the Anglican Church in Naples. Also in 2017 in Rome the knights, together with the Anglican community of Rome, received Pope Francis to strengthen the ecumenical bond between the Catholic and Anglican churches. In February 2018 David Hamid was appointed Grand Master of the Order, a title he still possesses, after the death of his predecessor.

== Ranks ==
The order of St. David is divided into two ranks:

- Apprentice
- Knight

== Grand Masters ==
- The Right Reverend Geoffrey Rowell (2007–2017)
- The Right Reverend David Hamid (2018 – present)
