= Godfrey Smith (journalist) =

English newspaper journalist (1926–2017)

- Born: 12 May 1926; Brentford, London, England
- Died: 22 December 2017 (aged 91); England
- Education: Worcester College, Oxford
- Occupations: Journalist and author
- Years active: 1951—2004
- Known for: Editor of The Sunday Times Magazine, author of The Business of Loving

Godfrey Smith FRSL (12 May 1926 — 22 December 2017) was an English newspaper journalist closely associated with The Sunday Times of London throughout much of his career. He was editor of The Sunday Times Magazine for seven years and of the paper's Weekly Review for another seven. He was subsequently a columnist in the newspaper from 1979 to his retirement in 2004.

He was also the author of five novels (the most successful being The Business of Loving) and three non-fiction works, and the editor of five anthologies. Smith was renowned in the world of journalism for his ebullience, extravagance, and love of fine dining.

== Early life ==
Smith was born in Brentford in West London on 12 May 1926, the elder son of a Bank of England clerk, Reginald Montague Smith, and Ada May Smith (née Damen). He was raised in Surbiton, a suburban neighbourhood in South West London, and from the age of 14 during World War II with his maternal grandparents in the market town of Alton, Hampshire. He was educated at Surbiton County Grammar School and then Eggars Grammar School in Alton.

In 1944, Smith went up to Worcester College, Oxford, where he combined reading Philosophy, politics and economics with training as a navigator in the Oxford University Air Squadron. He did not see war action, being sent to the Far East as a careers advisor to Royal Air Force (RAF) service members who were being demobilised. Smith returned to Worcester College after three years service with the RAF, and was President of the Oxford Union in the Michaelmas term of 1950, before graduating with a 2:1 degree.

While at Oxford, Smith was President of the Oxford Writers Club and had his first short stories published in the undergraduate magazine Oxford Viewpoint.

== Journalism ==
After leaving Oxford, Smith became personal assistant to Lord Kemsley, the then owner of The Sunday Times, for two years. He was appointed news editor of the paper in 1954. In 1957 he moved from news into features (in which he remained for the rest of his career), becoming assistant editor with responsibility for Atticus, a pseudonymous weekly column featuring society gossip. In 1959 he was made assistant editor of the features department of the Daily Express.

In 1964 Smith returned to The Sunday Times as Special Projects Editor, before in 1965 being appointed the "irrepressibly creative" editor of The Sunday Times Magazine, the newspaper's colour supplement. In Smith's seven years supervising the magazine it enjoyed a reputation for style, aided by a significantly large budget. He encouraged his staff and the freelancers he employed to exercise "the freedom to pursue ideas without restriction or budgetary restraint". Some of the best journalists and photographers of the time produced in-depth journalism, high-quality photography and a wide range of subject matter. The Magazine's art director, Michael Rand, called it "grit plus glamour – war photography juxtaposed with fashion and pop art". The work of photographers such as Don McCullin, Eve Arnold, Lord Snowdon, Terry O'Neill, and David Bailey was featured alongside articles by writers such as Ian Fleming, Bruce Chatwin, Jilly Cooper, and Nicholas Tomalin. One of Smith's obituarists described him as "the godfather" of a "golden age", and said he personified "a benign indulgence that concealed a sharp eye for talent and an instinct for the original". The magazine's advertising revenue under Smith's editorship was invaluable in keeping The Sunday Times in business.

In December 1966, when the Editor's chair of The Sunday Times became vacant, Smith "made it clear he had no ambitions to edit the paper".

Appointed an associate editor of The Sunday Times in 1972, Smith at the same time left the Magazine and became editor of the paper's "Weekly Review" pages, a post he retained until 1979. The Review presented readers with detailed coverage of the arts and culture. Books, films, television, radio, music, theatre and art were all examined and celebrated every week under Smith's seven–year editorship. He served a short period as a fiction critic for the Review in 1974.

In 1979, at the age of 53, Smith left the Review to become a long-running light columnist on the op-ed page of The Sunday Times. Revelling in ideas and stories prompted by readers (who were rewarded with a bottle of champagne) the column continued until, approaching his eighties, Smith retired in 2004. His work on the column was commended in the British Press Awards at the end of its first year.

A deputy editor on the Magazine, Mark Edmonds, said that "for all his flamboyance, Smith was also a heavyweight in the professional sense, frequently publishing ground-breaking material. ...He was an editor, an impresario, the man who initiated the big ideas and allowed others to get on with executing them."

== Novels ==
Smith was the author of five novels: The Flaw in the Crystal (1954), a Book Society Alternative Fiction choice; The Friends (1957); The Business of Loving (1961), the Book Society Choice for May 1961; The Network (1965), a satire on commercial television; and Caviare (1976). A sixth novel, Summertime, which Smith was working on in 1982, was not published.

The Business of Loving, a semi-autobiographical evocation of Smith's wartime teenage years in Alton, was the most well known and best received of his novels. It is often fondly recalled in later life in publications and on the internet by some of those who read it in youth. "I must have been 16 when I first read it," wrote one, "and nothing I had come across described more perfectly my own state of mind. It clutched at my heart ... ". In 1970, it was adapted for a Monday Night Theatre production on BBC Radio 4. "Mr Smith's deceptively artless novel was artfully adapted for radio ... ", wrote one critic.

== Non-fiction ==
Nine non-fiction publications followed the novels: The Best of Nathaniel Gubbins (1978), A World of Love (1982), Beyond the Tingle Quotient (1982), The English Companion (1984), The Christmas Reader (1985), The English Season (1986), The English Reader (1988), How it Was in the War (1989), and Take the Ball and Run (1991).

== Personal life ==
In 1951, Smith married Mary Schoenfield, an Austrian refugee who had arrived in the UK in 1938. The couple had three daughters. In the 1980s, after years living in a Regency house in St John's Wood, London, the Smiths settled into a farmhouse at Charlton, near Malmesbury in Wiltshire, where Smith became President of the Charlton Cricket Club. They retained a London base in North Kensington.

In 1995, Smith was elected a Fellow of the Royal Society of Literature. He was a member of both the Garrick and Savile clubs in London. Colleagues recalled Smith's passionate love for fine dining, gossip, and extravagance. "A committed bon viveur, raconteur and indefatigable lover of life ... he managed to find the time between meals to edit The Sunday Times Magazine", wrote one. Another remembered: "The day would probably start with breakfast at The Connaught, lunch at the Terrazza and dinner at Chez Victor."

Smith died in his sleep on 22 December 2017, at the age of 91.
