= Thomas Craske =

British bishop (1901–1971)

The Right Reverend Thomas Craske
- Bishop of Gibraltar
- Craske, photographed in 1961
- Diocese: Gibraltar
- In office: 1954–1959
- Predecessor: Cecil Horsley
- Successor: Stanley Eley

Personal details
- Born: 11 May 1901
- Died: 10 March 1971 (aged 69)
- Education: King's College London

Frederick William Thomas Craske (called Thomas (Note: While Bishop of Gibraltar, Craske signed himself "Thomas Gibraltar", the traditional way for serving bishops to sign: given name and See.) and Tom; 11 May 1901 – 10 March 1971) was Bishop of Gibraltar from 1953 to 1959.

== Family and education ==
Craske was born on 11 May 1901, son of William James Craske, and educated at King's College London. He therefore graduated Bachelor of Arts (BA) from the University of London and Associate of King's College (AKC) before embarking on an ecclesiastical career. He married Nellie, daughter of a Harold Wilson; they had two sons.

== Priestly ministry ==
He was made deacon at Michaelmas 1927 (2 October) by Arthur Winnington-Ingram, Bishop of London, at St Paul's Cathedral (by letters dimissory from the Bishop of Manchester) and ordained priest the following Michaelmas (23 September 1928) by William Temple, Bishop of Manchester, at Manchester Cathedral. He served his title (curacy) at St Chrysostom's Church, Victoria Park (Manchester).

He was on the staff of the Student Christian Movement of Great Britain from 1929 until 1932 (as International Secretary until 1930, and as London Secretary thereafter); during which time he was also an assistant curate at All Hallows Lombard Street (City of London) and a lecturer at King's College in 1932. After this he held incumbencies at John the Evangelist Read-in-Whalley (1932–1935) and St John the Evangelist, Blackburn (1935–1939). From 1939 to 1950 he was education secretary to the Missionary Council of the Church Assembly while also serving as founding General Secretary of the Church of England Youth Council (1942–1944) and a Select Preacher at Cambridge in 1943. He was representative of the British Council of Churches in Germany, 1950–1953, serving also as an Examining Chaplain for Vernon Smith, Bishop of Leicester.

== Episcopal ministry ==
Craske was consecrated into bishop's orders on St Andrew's Day 1953 (30 November), by Geoffrey Fisher, Archbishop of Canterbury, at Canterbury Cathedral. While Bishop of Gibraltar, he became a Fellow of King's College in 1954; and a Chaplain and Sub-Prelate of the Order of St John of Jerusalem in 1956. He resigned his See in 1959 to become Moderator of the Central Advisory Council for the Ministry (1959–1965); he served as Assistant Bishop of London from 1961 until his death at home in Raynes Park. He became Chairman of the Prison Chaplaincies Council of the Church Assembly in the same year.

== Notes ==
Church of England titles
Preceded by Cecil Horsley	Bishop of Gibraltar; 1953– 1959	Succeeded by Stanley Eley
