= Stanley Eley =

British Anglican bishop

Stanley Albert Hallam Eley (1904–1990) was a British Anglican bishop who served as Bishop of Gibraltar (in the Church of England) from 1960 to 1970.

He was made a deacon by Harold Bilbrough, Bishop of Dover, on St Matthew's Day (21 September) 1924, at St Andrew's, Croydon; ordained a priest by Randall Davidson, Archbishop of Canterbury, in Advent 1925 (19 December), at Canterbury Cathedral; and consecrated a bishop by Geoffrey Fisher, Archbishop of Canterbury, on Lady Day (25 March) 1960, at Westminster Abbey. Eley married Doreen Bourne, a scion of the Judkin-Fitzgerald baronets; they had no children.

Church of England titles
Preceded by Thomas Craske	Bishop of Gibraltar; 1960 – 1970	Succeeded by John Satterthwaite as Bishop of Fulham and Gibraltar
