= Charles Harris (bishop) =

Charles Amyand Harris (1813–1874) was a priest in the Church of England and Bishop of Gibraltar.

== Family ==
Harris was born at Christchurch, Hampshire, on 4 August 1813. He was the third son of James Edward Harris, 2nd Earl of Malmesbury and Harriet Susan Dashwood. His elder brother was James Harris, 3rd Earl of Malmesbury.

== Life ==
Harris matriculated from Oriel College, Oxford on 5 May 1831; he graduated with a B.A. in 1835, followed by an M.A. in 1837. He was a fellow of All Souls' College from 1835 to 1837. In 1834 he was entered as a student of the Inner Temple but, changing his mind, was ordained as a deacon in 1836 and as a priest in 1837.

On 20 May 1837, he married Katherine Lucia, youngest daughter of Sir Edward O'Brien, 4th Baronet. They had one son, James Edward Harris, who died in childhood.

He acted as rector of Shaftesbury, Dorset, during 1839–40. In 1840 he was appointed to the rectory of Wilton in Wiltshire, which had attached to it the rectory of Bulbridge and the vicarage of Ditchampton. On 16 August 1841 he was nominated prebendary of Chardstock in Salisbury Cathedral, and made a domestic chaplain to the bishop of the diocese. In 1841 he wrote the sermon One Rule and One Mind.

His health failed in 1848, when he resigned his livings. After some years of rest, in 1856 he became the perpetual curate of Rownhams, Southampton, where Lord Herbert, in conjunction with the widow of Major Colt, had built a new parish church. In 1863, he succeeded Reverend Henry Drury as archdeacon of Wiltshire, when he was also made vicar of Bremhill-with-Highway, near Chippenham. There he remained an active parish priest and a coadjutor to his bishop until 1868, when he was nominated to the bishopric of Gibraltar, and consecrated on 1 May.

His kindly manner, gentle bearing, knowledge of languages and long experience fitted him for his new duties in Gibraltar. More than once, he gave an account of his work at the meetings of the Society for the Propagation of the Gospel.

== Death and legacy ==
In 1872 he suffered from a fever. Returning to England, he resigned his bishopric in October 1873. He settled at Torquay, where he died on 16 March 1874. He was buried at St Martins, Bremhill, Wiltshire on 19 March by the side of his wife, who had died at Bremhill vicarage on 31 January 1865. In his will he left considerable sums to episcopal societies, as well as legacies to his relatives.

Church of England titles
Preceded by Walter John Trower	Bishop of Gibraltar; May 1873– October 1873	Succeeded by Charles Waldegrave Sandford
