= Henry Knight (bishop) =

Henry Joseph Corbett Knight (22 June 1859 in East India – 27 November 1920 in Hitchin) was Bishop of Gibraltar from 1911 until his death.

Henry Knight was born on 22 June 1859, son of the Rev. John Lister Knight. He was educated at Islington Proprietary School and St Catharine's College, Cambridge, where he graduated tenth Classic in 1882. He was ordained in 1886. He began his career as Tutor (Lecturer) in Theology at Selwyn College, Cambridge (1885–1895). After this he was Rector of Marnhull (1895–1901) and also Examining Chaplain to the Bishop of Salisbury. He then returned to Cambridge as a Fellow of Corpus Christi, and Principal of the Clergy Training School, where he remained until his appointment to the episcopate. He was consecrated bishop on St James's Day (25 July), by Randall Davidson, Archbishop of Canterbury, at St Paul's Cathedral. A Sub-Prelate of the Order of St John of Jerusalem, he died on 27 November 1920. His brother, Arthur Knight, was the third Bishop of Rangoon.

== Notes ==
Church of England titles
Preceded by William Edward Collins	Bishop of Gibraltar in Europe; 1911– 1920	Succeeded by John Harold Greig
