= Cecil Horsley =

British Anglican bishop (1903–1953)

Cecil Douglas Horsley ChStJ (26 July 1903 – 10 March 1953) was a British Anglican bishop who served as Bishop of Colombo then of Gibraltar in the mid 20th century.

He was born in Gillingham, Kent, on 26 July 1906 to Admiral Arthur John Horsley and Mary Vyse Stoughton. He was educated at Brighton College and Queens' College, Cambridge, before embarking on an ecclesiastical career with curacies at Romsey Abbey and St Saviour's, Ealing. He was ordained priest on Trinity Sunday (15 June) 1930, by Theodore Woods, Bishop of Winchester, at Winchester Cathedral. After this he was vicar of St John the Evangelist, Upper Norwood, before his elevation to the episcopate in 1938. He was consecrated Bishop of Colombo on All Saints' Day (17 November) 1938, by Cosmo Lang, Archbishop of Canterbury, at Westminster Abbey.

He was translated to Gibraltar on 25 September 1947 (invested by Geoffrey Fisher, Archbishop of Canterbury, at Lambeth Palace Chapel). A chaplain and a sub-prelate of the Order of St John of Jerusalem, he died in post on 10 March 1953.

Church of England titles
Preceded by Mark Carpenter-Garnier	Bishop of Colombo; 1938– 1947	Succeeded by Rollo Graham Campbell
Preceded by Harold Buxton	Bishop of Gibraltar; 1947– 1953	Succeeded by Thomas Craske
