= Harold Buxton =

British Church of England cleric

Harold Jocelyn Buxton (20 June 1880 – 13 March 1976) was a British Church of England cleric. He was Bishop of Gibraltar from 1933 to 1947.

Buxton was born into a noble family, the son of Thomas Buxton, 3rd Baronet, on 20 June 1880. He was educated at Harrow and Trinity College, Cambridge. In 1904 he embarked on his ecclesiastical career with a curacy at St Cuthbert, Bensham. From 1907 to 1910 he was Domestic Chaplain to the Bishop of Rangoon, and from 1911 to 1914 curate of Thaxted. From 1914 to 1918 he was Vicar of Horley, Oxfordshire; during World War I he was also a temporary Chaplain to the Forces in France and attached to the Russian Red Cross at Erzurum in the Ottoman Empire. From 1926 to 1927 he was Chaplain of St. George's Cathedral, Jerusalem, and then, before his appointment to the episcopate, Archdeacon of Cyprus from 1928 to 1932. A Sub-Prelate of the Order of St John of Jerusalem, he died on 13 March 1976.

Church of England titles
Preceded by Nugent Hicks	Bishop of Gibraltar; 1933–1947	Succeeded by Cecil Horsley
