= Cambridge Apostles =

Secret society at the University of Cambridge, UK

- Founded: 1 April 1820; 206 years ago University of Cambridge
- Type: Secret society
- Affiliation: Independent
- Status: Unknown
- Emphasis: Debate
- Scope: Local
- Chapters: 1
- Former name: Conversazione Society
- Headquarters: Cambridge, England; United Kingdom

The Cambridge Apostles (also known as the Conversazione Society) is or was an intellectual society at the University of Cambridge founded in 1820 by George Tomlinson, a Cambridge student who became the first bishop of Gibraltar.

== History ==
Student George Tomlinson founded what he called the "Conversazione Society" at the University of Cambridge on 1 April 1820. This intellectual society soon was called the Cambridge Apostles because of its twelve original members. These founding members were it seems Tory, evangelical Anglican students from St John's College, Cambridge. New members were invited and elected to membership by the extant membership. The membership and activities of the society were secret, but it met regularly at least until 1970.

The Apostles was essentially formed as a discussion group to explore and debate, in a small group, questions of philosophy, politics, ethics, governance, and religion, inter alia. Meetings were held once per week, traditionally on Saturday evenings, during which one member would give a prepared talk on a topic (or a question for debate) that was then thrown open for discussion. Members also shared poetry and dance lessons. In the early 20th century, the Cambridge Apostles were considered by some "as a haven for overt, full-blooded—almost aggressive—homosexuality." After reading her son's letters, one Apostle's mother called the group "a hotbed of vice".

The Apostles first admitted women in the 1970s. This was also the decade when the society's last known members graduated from Cambridge, leading one writer to question in 2023 whether or not the Apostles were still active. As of that time, even the society's annual dinner had become "a somewhat erratic occurrence".

The Apostles' papers up to 1930 are housed at King's College, Cambridge, archives.

== Traditions ==
The members would meet weekly to eat "whales" (anchovies or sardines on toast) and discuss an essay written by a member. The debate at each meeting was called the discussion on the Hearth Rug because the speaker stood with the moderator on a hearth rug when speaking if one was present.

The Apostles retained minutes of meetings and a leather diary of their membership, the Photo Book, stretching back to its founding. These include handwritten notes about the topics on which each member had spoken. It was included in the so-called Ark, a cedar chest containing a collection of papers about the topics discussed and the results of votes on the propositions nominated for debate. It was a point of honor that the question voted upon should bear only a tangential relationship to the matter debated.

Active members were referred to as Apostles; they called each other Brethren. After retirement from the society, Apostles were said to "take wings" and become Angels. Undergraduates applied to become Angels after graduating or being awarded a fellowship. Every few years, amid great secrecy, all the Angels were invited to an Apostles' dinner at a Cambridge college. There used to be an annual dinner, usually held in London.

== Membership ==
There are only twelve members at any given time, and membership is secret.

Membership consisted largely of undergraduates, but there have been graduate students and members who already have held university and college posts. The society traditionally drew most of its members from Christ's, St John's, Jesus, Trinity and King's Colleges, although, in the 20th century, the majority of its members came from King's and Trinity. Women first were elected into the society in the 1970s, though the question "Should we like to elect women" was put (and the division upon it apparently won) at a much earlier meeting.

Undergraduates being considered for membership were called embryos and were invited to embryo parties, where members judged whether the student should be invited to join. The embryos attended these parties without knowing they were being considered for membership. Becoming an Apostle involved taking an oath of secrecy and listening to the reading of a curse, originally written by Apostle Fenton John Anthony Hort, the theologian, on the occasion of the resignation of Henry John Roby from the Apostles after his joining in 1855.

== Members ==
Alfred Tennyson joined the Apostles in 1829, probably through the invitation of his friend Arthur Hallam. Bertrand Russell and G. E. Moore joined as students, as did John Maynard Keynes, who invited Ludwig Wittgenstein to join. Russell had been worried that Wittgenstein would not appreciate the group's unseriousness and style of humour. Wittgenstein was admitted in 1912 but resigned almost immediately because he could not tolerate the level of the discussion on the Hearth Rug. He also had trouble tolerating the discussions in the Moral Sciences Club. He rejoined in the 1920s when he returned to Cambridge.

Soviet spies Anthony Blunt, Guy Burgess and John Cairncross, three of the Cambridge Five, and Michael Straight were all members of the Apostles in the early 1930s.

== Bibliography ==
- Allen, Peter (1978). The Cambridge Apostles: The Early Years. Cambridge University Press. ISBN 978-0-521-21803-0.
- Deacon, Richard (1986). The Cambridge Apostles: A History of Cambridge University's Elite Intellectual Secret Society. Farrar, Straus and Giroux. ISBN 978-0-374-11820-4.
- Levy, Paul (1980). Moore: G. E. Moore and the Cambridge Apostles. Holt, Rinehart and Winston. ISBN 978-0-03-053616-8.
