= Geoffrey Rowell =

Anglican bishop of Gibraltar (1943–2017)

The Right Reverend Geoffrey Rowell
- Bishop in Europe
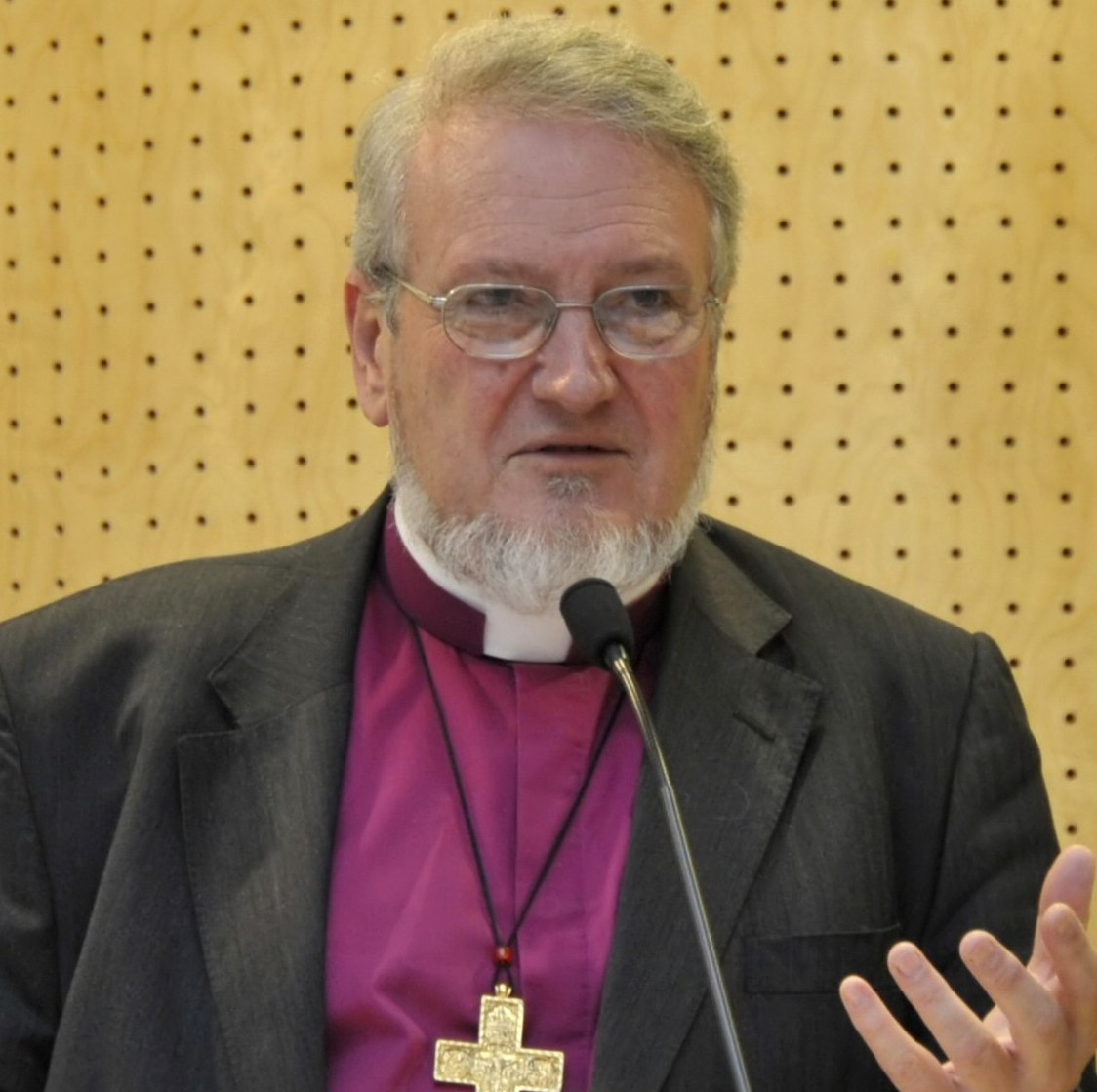
- Rowell in Vienna, Austria, in 2009
- Diocese: Diocese in Europe
- In office: 2001–2013
- Predecessor: John Hind
- Successor: Robert Innes
- Other post: Bishop of Basingstoke (1994–2001)

Orders
- Ordination: Deacon 1968; Priest 1969
- Consecration: 2 February 1994 by George Carey

Personal details
- Born: 13 February 1943 Alton, Hampshire, England
- Died: 11 June 2017 (aged 74)
- Denomination: Anglican
- Education: Corpus Christi College, Cambridge

Douglas Geoffrey Rowell (/ˈraʊəl/; 13 February 1943 – 11 June 2017) was an Anglican bishop and historian. He served as Bishop of Basingstoke and then as the third Bishop in Europe until his retirement on 8 November 2013. Following his retirement he ministered as an assistant bishop in the Diocese of Chichester (from 2013) and in the Diocese of Portsmouth (from 2015). He died in the early morning of Trinity Sunday, 11 June 2017.

== Early life and education ==
Rowell was born on 13 February 1943 in Alton, Hampshire, England. He was the eldest son of Cecil Victor Rowell (1908–1997), an engineer, and Kate Rowell (née Hunter; 1905–1995), a teacher of sick children. Having passed the eleven-plus, he was educated at Eggar's Grammar School, the state grammar school in Alton. He was then awarded a Hampshire County Council scholarship and finished his schooling at Winchester College, then an all-boys independent boarding school.

Rowell was educated at Eggar's Grammar School, a state grammar school, and then, having received a Hampshire County Council scholarship, at Winchester College, then an all-boys independent boarding school. He studied theology at Corpus Christi College, Cambridge, graduating with a Bachelor of Arts (BA) degree in 1964: as per tradition, his BA was promoted to a Master of Arts (MA Cantab) degree in 1968. He continued his studies and graduated with a Doctor of Philosophy degree in 1968. His doctoral supervisor was David Newsome. During his doctorate, he trained for ordination at Cuddesdon College, an Anglo-Catholic theological college, and also spent time at a Greek Orthodox seminary and a Coptic monastery.

He was later incorporated MA at the University of Oxford. In 1997 he was awarded the degree of Doctor of Divinity (DD) by the same university.

== Career ==
Rowell was ordained in the Church of England as a deacon in 1968 and as a priest in 1969. From 1968 to 1972, his served as assistant chaplain of New College, Oxford and honorary curate at St Andrew's Church, Headington. His part-time appointment at St Andrew's was his only experience of parochial ministry in the Church of England. It was at New College that Rowell's "very Anglican brand of conservative Anglo-Catholicism" was nurtured by the chaplain Gareth Bennett.

In 1972, Rowell was appointed fellow, chaplain, and tutor at Keble College, Oxford: he would stay at the college for the next 22 years. He revised his doctorate into his first book Hell and the Victorians, published in 1974. He was additionally appointed a university lecturer in 1977. His research focused on the Oxford Movement, and he taught undergraduate paper on John Henry Newman and the Oxford Movement. He was appointed Wiccamical Prebendary (an honorary post) at Chichester Cathedral in 1980.

Rowell was consecrated as a bishop by George Carey, Archbishop of Canterbury, on 2 February 1994 at St Paul's Cathedral, becoming Bishop of Basingstoke, a suffragan bishopric in the Diocese of Winchester.

From 1999, Rowell was an episcopal patron of Project Canterbury, an online archive of Anglican texts.

Rowell was commissioned as Bishop of Gibraltar in Europe (often called "Bishop in Europe") on 18 October 2001 at St Margaret's, Westminster, and enthroned at the Cathedral of the Holy Trinity, Gibraltar, on 1 November 2001.

=== Views ===
Rowell opposed the ordination of women: "Although his opposition was expressed in terms of its effects on ecumenical relations, his Tractarian ideal of the church based on close male friendships meant there was little space for women in leadership." At the November 2012 meeting of the General Synod of the Church of England, he was one of the three members of the House of Bishops who voted against the consecration of women as bishops.

Rowell was part of the traditionalist Anglo-Catholic wing of the Church of England.

== Turkish controversies ==
In 2004, Rowell disagreed publicly with parishioners in Turkey over his plans to lease a historic and recently renovated church building for use as a nightclub. The plan was defeated after popular complaints.

In January 2007, Rowell suspended the chaplain of Istanbul, Ian Sherwood, and the entire chaplaincy council. By 2008 the disagreement between Rowell and the Anglican chaplaincies in Turkey had intensified, as the bishop insisted on ordaining a Turkish convert from Islam despite complaints from local Anglican clergy and laity that the ordination would place them in serious physical danger. When the bishop arrived to carry out the ordination he found himself locked out of all six Anglican churches and was forced to administer the ordination in a borrowed Calvinist chapel. The secretary of the Istanbul chaplaincy council described Rowell as a "rogue bishop", whilst the senior chaplain in Turkey accused Rowell of causing suffering to ordinary people because the bishop's life had been largely "in the shelter of Oxford University".

== Personal life ==
Rowell never married nor had any children.

== Honours and associations ==
He was created a Companion of the Roll of Honour of the Memorial of Merit of King Charles the Martyr in 2017. Rowell was a member of the men-only, high-church dining club, Nobody's Friends, and wrote its official history in 2000.

== Styles ==
- The Reverend Geoffrey Rowell (1968–1981)
- The Reverend Canon Geoffrey Rowell (1981–1994)
- The Right Reverend Geoffrey Rowell (1994–2017)

== Writings ==
Rowell was extensively published in the field of Anglo-Catholic church history. He was the founding president of the Anglo Catholic History Society. He authored or co-authored the following:

- Rowell, Geoffrey; Stevenson, Kenneth; Williams, Rowan (2003). Love's Redeeming Work: The Anglican Quest for Holiness. OUP Oxford. ISBN 978-0-19-150087-9.
- — (1991). The Vision Glorious: Themes and Personalities of the Catholic Revival in Anglicanism. Clarendon Press. ISBN 978-0-19-826332-6.
- —; Chilcott-Monk, Julien (2003). Come, Lord Jesus!: Daily Readings for Advent, Christmas, and Epiphany. Morehouse. ISBN 978-0-8192-1964-0.
- — (1992). The English religious tradition and the genius of Anglicanism. Ikon. ISBN 978-1-871805-02-4.

Rowell co-authored and edited these anthologies:

- — (1990). Confession and Absolution (Essays on the sacrament of penance). London: SPCK. ISBN 0-281-04442-2.
- — (1993). The Oil of Gladness - Anointing in the Christian tradition (Essays on the sacrament of unction). London: SPCK. ISBN 0-8146-2245-3.

== See also ==
- Order of St. David of Wales, St. Alban and St. Crescentino
