= George Tomlinson (bishop) =

English cleric

The Right Reverend George Tomlinson
- Bishop of Gibraltar
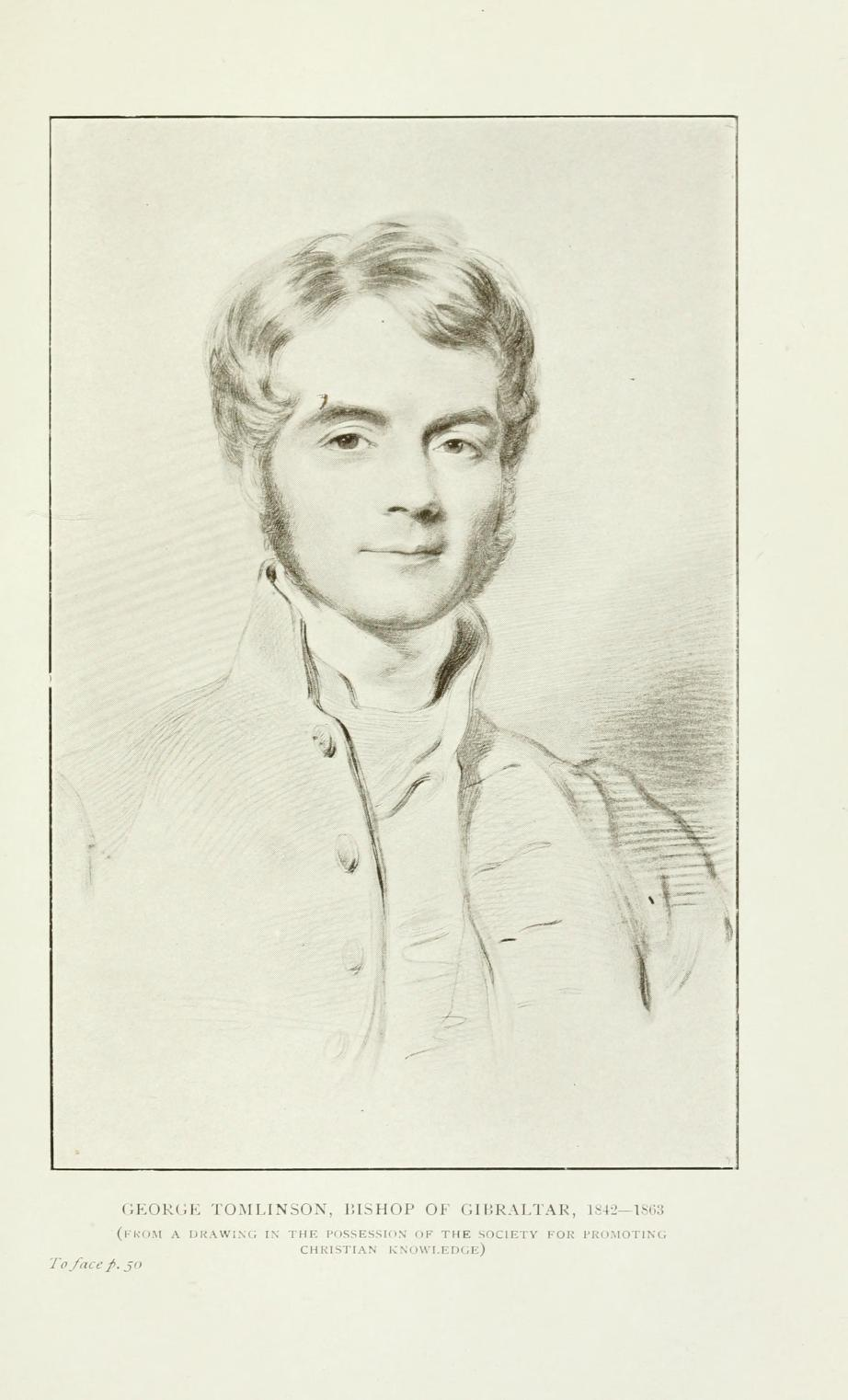
- Church: Church of England
- Diocese: Gibraltar
- In office: 1842–1863

Personal details
- Born: 12 March 1794 Lancashire, England
- Died: 6 February 1863 (aged 68) Gibraltar Palace, Gibraltar

George Tomlinson (12 March 1794 – 6 February 1863) was an English cleric, the Anglican Bishop of Gibraltar from 1842 to 1863.

== Biography ==
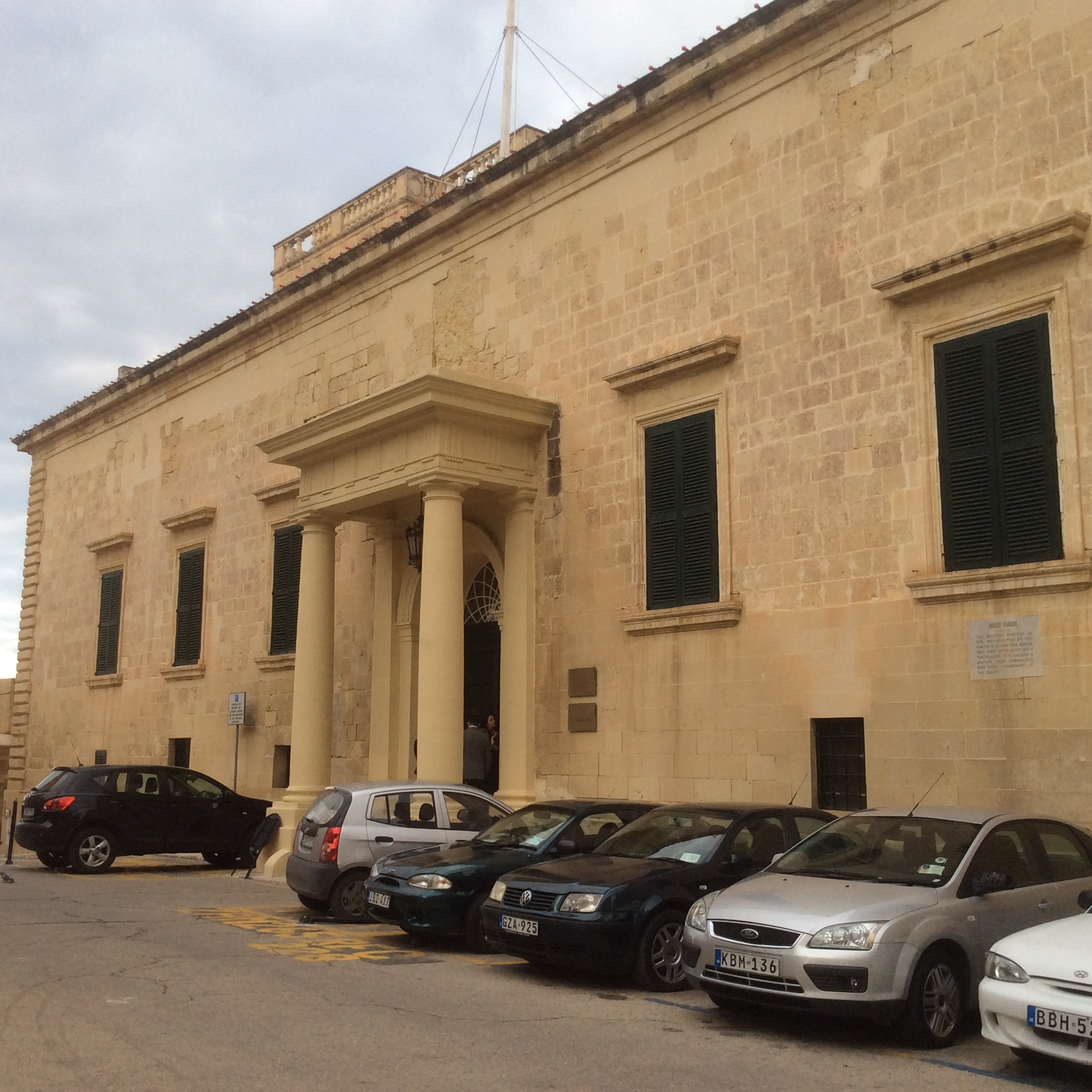
Auberge d'Aragon in Valletta, Malta, which was leased to Tomlinson in the 1840s under the name Gibraltar House.

Tomlinson was born in Lancashire, the son of John Tomlinson and Martha Dean. He was first educated at St Saviour's Grammar School, Southwark, and entered St John's College, Cambridge, in 1818, matriculating in 1819. He graduated B.A. in 1823, M.A. in 1826, and D.D. in 1842. He was founder of the Cambridge Apostles.

Ordained in 1822, Tomlinson became chaplain to William Howley, the Bishop of London, and was employed as a tutor by Sir Robert Peel. In 1825 he became secretary to the City of London Infant School Society, a High Church alternative around Howley, Peel and Charles James Blomfield to the Infant School Society of Samuel Wilderspin.

From 1831 to 1842, Tomlinson was secretary to the SPCK. There he wrote for the Saturday Magazine, and founded the Clergy List and Ecclesiastical Gazette. In 1840 he undertook an ecumenical mission in the Levant and wrote a report on it.

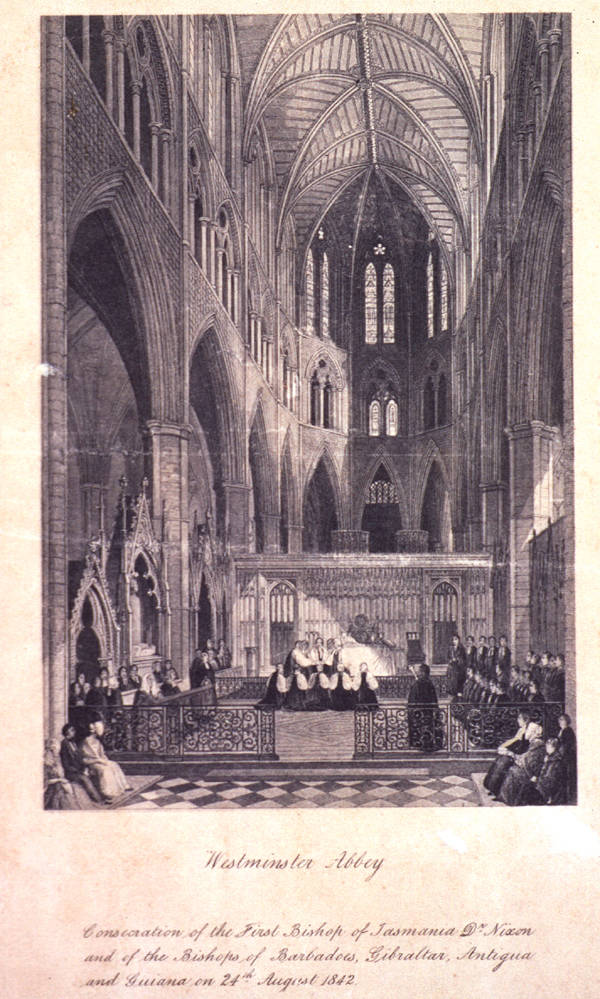
Tomlinson's consecration

On 24 August 1842, Tomlinson was consecrated a bishop at Westminster Abbey. He arrived in Gibraltar in 1842 with Robert Wilson, the new governor, on HMS Warspite. He died there on 9 February 1863, aged 68.

== Family ==
Tomlinson married twice. His first wife was Louisa, daughter of Gen. Sir Patrick Stuart; they were married in 1848, and she died in 1850. His second wife was Eleanor Jane, daughter of Colonel Charles Mackenzie Fraser, 10th Laird of Inverallochy and 6th of Castle Fraser; they were married in 1855.
