= William B. Trower Bayshore Natural Area Preserve =

Protected area in Northampton County, Virginia, United States

Coordinates: 37°11′36″N 76°0′4″W

William B. Trower Bayshore Natural Area Preserve is a Natural Area Preserve located in Northampton County, Virginia. A small preserve with no public facilities, it is located on the Chesapeake Bay, and contains beach strand and dune communities. It supports a population of the northeastern beach tiger beetle, as well as some scrubland and woodland areas.

The preserve was named in honor of William Bell Trower, a Northampton County physician and farmer. The land for the preserve, part of Trower's original landholdings on Virginia's Eastern Shore, was donated to the commonwealth of Virginia by his eldest daughter after his death.
