= Charles Trower =

English cricketer

Personal information
- Full name: Charles Francis Trower
- Born: 21 April 1817; Marylebone, Middlesex, England
- Died: 3 June 1891 (aged 74); Kensington, London, England
- Batting: Unknown

Domestic team information
- Years: Team
- 1838–1840: Oxford University

Career statistics
Competition	First-class
Matches	3
Runs scored	116
Batting average	19.33
100s/50s	–/–
Top score	48
Catches/stumpings	–/–
- Source: Cricinfo, 21 February 2020

Charles Francis Trower (21 April 1817 – 3 June 1891) was an English first-class cricketer and barrister.

== Early life ==
The son of John Trower and his second wife Sophia Baker, he was born at Marylebone in April 1817. An elder half-brother was Walter John Trower. He was educated at Winchester College, before going up to Exeter College, Oxford.

== Cricket career ==
While studying at Oxford, he made three appearances in first-class cricket for Oxford University, playing twice in 1838 against the Marylebone Cricket Club (MCC) and Cambridge University, before making a third appearance against the MCC in 1840. He scored a total of 116 runs in his three matches, at an average of 19.33 and a high score of 48.

== Legal career and later life ==
A student of the Inner Temple, he was called to the bar in November 1842. He was the secretary of presentations to Lord Chancellor Westbury in 1862 and was also the author of a number of legal publications. He was a founding member of the English Church Union and hosted the Union's first meeting (when it was called the Church of England Protection Society) in his rooms at 27 Victoria Street Westminster on 8 February 1859.

Trower married Frances Mary Bradley on 18 December 1843 in Southampton, living mostly in Sussex he died at Kensington in June 1891.
