= George E. Trower =

American politician and minister

George E. Trower (1855 – ?) was a minister and state legislator in Arkansas.

In 1886 the Republican assembly nominated Trower, who was residing in Morrilton, Arkansas, as their candidate for the Arkansas House of Representatives. Trower was the only black republican on the ticket and had little support from the white Republicans in the northern townships, however he won by a narrow margin of 21 votes.

He represented Conway County, Arkansas in the Arkansas House of Representatives in 1887 as a Republican.

After winning the election the Democrats started harassing him and discovered that he had been performing marriages for over a year without the correct authority. Trowler immediately gained the proper certificate as a minister of the Gospel but the Democrats requested that the matter was referred to a grand jury.

After returning home from the legislature in April 1887, he was taken off a train at gunpoint by two Plumerville Democrats Benjamin White and Thomas Hervey and reported to have been assassinated. These reports turned out not to be true and he had moved to Independence County, Arkansas to pastor at an African Methodist Episcopal church in Batesville.
