= Charles Sandford (bishop) =

Fourth Bishop of Gibraltar (1828–1903)

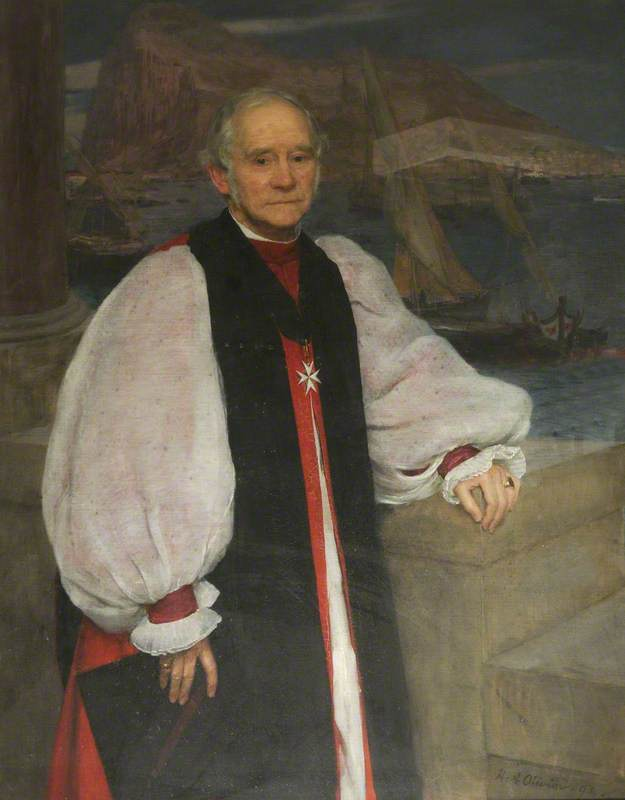
Charles Waldegrave Sandford, by Herbert Arnould Olivier

Charles Waldegrave Sandford (1828–1903) was the fourth Bishop of Gibraltar.

He was born in 1828 into an ecclesiastical family and educated at Rugby and Christ Church, Oxford. Later he was a Tutor there then Rector of Bishopsbourne before his elevation to the episcopate. A Sub-Prelate of the Order of St John of Jerusalem, he died on 8 December 1903. His grandfather Daniel Sandford and first cousin Daniel Sandford were also Anglican bishops.

== Publications ==
Sandford, C. W. (1886) Our church in Cyprus: a sermon. Oxford & London: Parker and Co.

== Notes ==
Church of England titles
Preceded by Charles Amyand Harris	Bishop of Gibraltar in Europe; 1874– 1903	Succeeded by William Edward Collins
