= Bishop in Europe =

Diocesan bishop

- Bishopric

anglican
- Incumbent; Robert Innes

Location
- Ecclesiastical province: Province of Canterbury
- Residence: Worth, Crawley (1993–2013); Waterloo, Belgium (since 2014)

Information
- First holder: George Tomlinson
- Established: 1842
- Diocese: Diocese in Europe
- Cathedral: Cathedral of the Holy Trinity, Gibraltar

The Bishop of Gibraltar in Europe, commonly known as the Bishop in Europe, is the ordinary of the Church of England's Diocese in Europe in the Province of Canterbury.

== Overview ==
The diocese provides the ministry of Anglican chaplains, not only in the area of Gibraltar in British jurisdiction but also in all of mainland Europe, Morocco and the territory of the former Soviet Union. The see is based in the City of Gibraltar where the bishop's seat is located at the Cathedral Church of the Holy Trinity.

Two previous bishops, John Hind (1993–2001) and Geoffrey Rowell (2001–2013), resided in England at Bishop's Lodge in Worth, Crawley, West Sussex (close to Gatwick Airport, to facilitate ease of travel). The current bishop, Robert Innes (2014–present), is based in Waterloo, Belgium. The diocesan office and administrative team, with the office of the suffragan bishop, is in Tufton Street, London, part of the Church House complex.

The bishopric has existed since the union in 1980 of the see of Gibraltar (founded 1842) with the Jurisdiction of North and Central Europe of the see of London (headed by the suffragan Bishop of Fulham).

== List of diocesan bishops ==
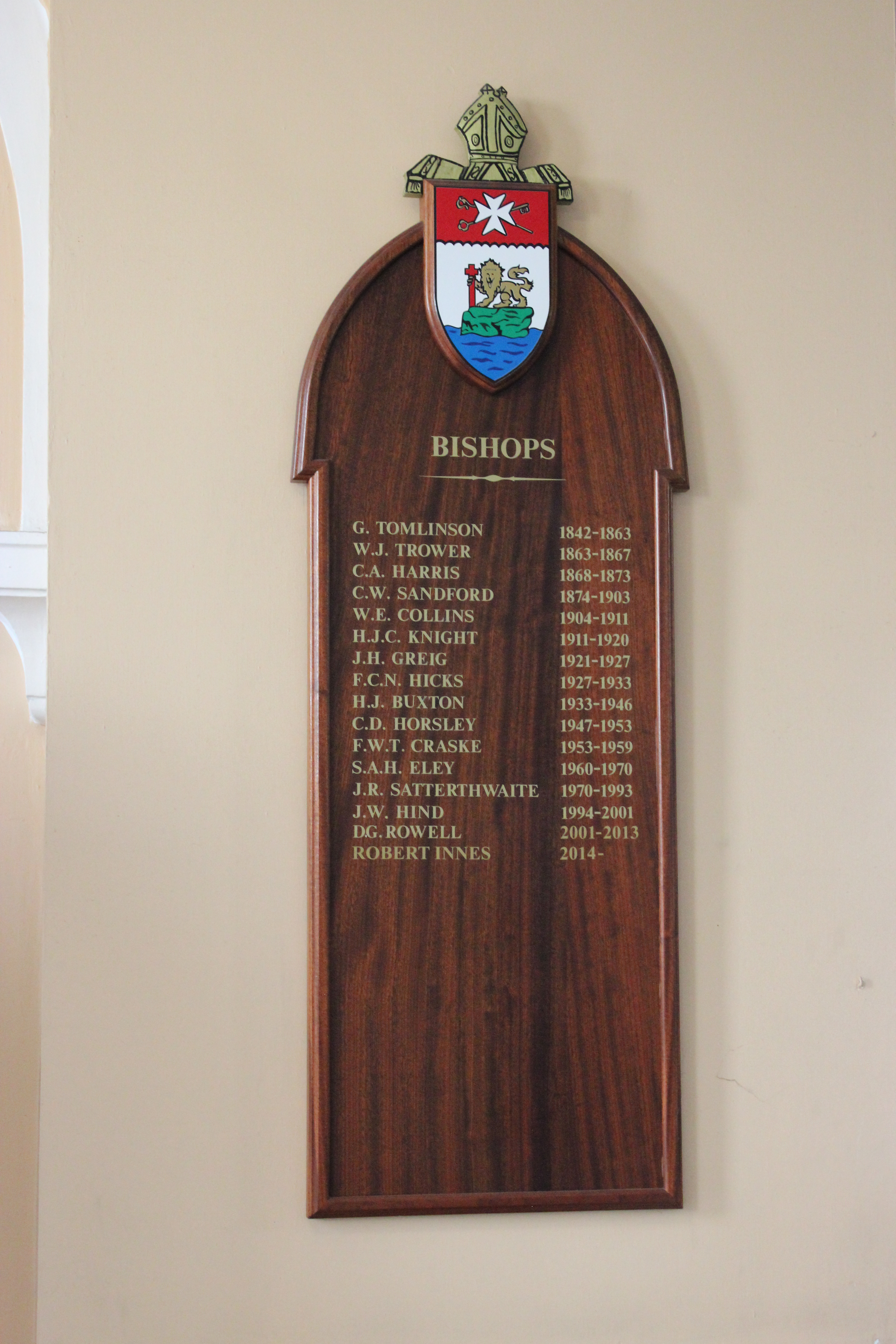
List of Bishops of Gibraltar in the Cathedral of the Holy Trinity, Gibraltar

(Any dates appearing in italics indicate de facto continuation of office. The start date of tenure below is the date of appointment or succession. Where known, the date of installation and ordination as bishop are listed in the notes together with the post held prior to appointment.)

Bishops of Gibraltar
From	Until	Incumbent	Notes
1842	1863	George Tomlinson	A founder of the Cambridge Apostles
1863	1868	Walter Trower	
1868	1873	Charles Harris	Resigned due to ill health, October 1873
1874	1903	Charles Sandford	Died in office, 8 December 1903
1904	1911	William Collins	Died in office, 22 March 1911
1911	1920	Henry Knight	Died in office, 27 November 1920
1921	1927	John Greig	Translated to Guildford 1927
1927	1932	Nugent Hicks	Translated to Lincoln 1932
1933	1946	Harold Buxton	Retired
1947	1953	Cecil Horsley	Died in office, 10 March 1953
1954	1960	Thomas Craske	Retired
1960	1970	Stanley Eley	Retired
1970	1980	John Satterthwaite	Also Bishop of Fulham. Translated to Gibraltar in Europe 1980
Bishops (of Gibraltar) in Europe
1980	1993	John Satterthwaite	Retired
1993	2001	John Hind	Translated to Chichester
2001	2013	Geoffrey Rowell	Retired 8 November 2013.
2014	present	Robert Innes	

== Suffragan and assistant bishops ==
The bishop also has one suffragan bishop, known as the Suffragan Bishop in Europe (currently Andrew Norman) and various honorary assistant bishops from the Church of England and other churches in communion with the Church of England. Immediately prior to the 1980 (re)erection of the diocese and the creation of the post of Suffragan Bishop, the Diocese of Gibraltar and the jurisdiction of Fulham shared a full-time assistant bishop in a similar post – at least Harold Isherwood and Ambrose Weekes served in that role; indeed Weekes became the first Suffragan Bishop in 1980. (See Suffragan Bishop in Europe.)

Edmund Capper and Ambrose Weekes were assistant (auxiliary) bishops of the diocese in 1988; Weekes was still one in 2004. Ken Giggall, former Bishop of St Helena, Chaplain of Sanremo with Bordighera was also an auxiliary bishop (1979–1981). Frank Sargeant, retired Bishop at Lambeth, was an assistant bishop of the diocese, 1999–2008.

Nicholas Reade, retired bishop of Blackburn, was licensed an honorary assistant bishop in 2013.

== See also ==
- Spanish Reformed Episcopal Church
- Lusitanian Catholic Apostolic Evangelical Church
- Roman Catholic Diocese of Gibraltar

== Sources ==
- Whitaker's Almanack 1883 to 2004, Joseph Whitaker and Sons Ltd/A&C Black, London
- Diocese in Europe – Bishops
