= Bergen Anglican Church =

Church in Bergen, Norway

Coordinates: 60°23′34.2″N 5°18′58.7″E

Bergen Anglican Church is a congregation of the Church of England in the Anglican Chaplaincy in Norway in the city of Bergen, Norway. Emerging in the late 1950s and institutionalised in 1962 the congregation was a spiritual home for British expatriates and especially the Second World War "War Brides" from Scotland. The congregation has grown to become broadly international in character providing worship in the English language. Since its emergence the congregation's strong core lay ministry and leadership was supplemented periodically by visiting or designated Anglican priests from St Edmund's Anglican Church in Oslo, and beginning in the 1990s was served by Peter Hogarth who served as the Assistant Chaplain for Western Norway, who was arrested for possession of child abuse images some years after the end of his responsibility for Bergen (https://www.churchtimes.co.uk/articles/2019/6-september/news/world/prison-for-norway-cleric-over-child-abuse-images ). Mpole Samuel Masemola was installed as the congregation's first resident priest January 2013, and left in July 2015. Normal worship services were first held at the Engensenteret Chapel, Baneveien 1, near Nøstet, and now at the historic Mariakirken i Bergen or St Mary's Church, Bergen since 2015. Within the scope of the Porvoo Communion the congregation enjoys close cooperation with the Bergen Cathedral parish of the Church of Norway. As a congregation within the Anglican Chaplaincy in Norway the Bergen Anglican Church is a part of the Archdeaconry of Germany and Northern Europe in the Diocese of Gibraltar in Europe, which is part of the province of Canterbury in the Church of England. The diocesan bishop is Robert Innes and David Hamid is Suffragan Bishop in Europe.

== Lay Assistants ==
- 1962–1993: R. Short
- 1962–1974: E. Minde
- 1966–1967: A. Thompson
- 1967–1969: W. Alcock
- 1967–1969: R. Drake
- 1973–1976: O. C. Bakkefjord

== Lay Readers ==
- 2007–present: Iris Evans Bjørnø

== Church Warden ==
- 2014–present: Eirik Duerr

== Assistant Chaplains ==
- ?–2012: Peter Hogarth https://www.churchtimes.co.uk/articles/2019/6-september/news/world/prison-for-norway-cleric-over-child-abuse-images
- 2013–2015: Mpole Samuel Masemola (first resident priest in Bergen and the first ever Anglican to be ordained to the priesthood within the borders of Norway on the Feast Day of the Presentation of the Lord in the Temple, 02 February 2006, by Bishop David Hamid)
- 2016-: Kirk Weisz

== See also ==
- Anglicanism in Norway
