= St Mary's Church, Bergen =

Church in Vestland, Norway

St. Mary's Church
- Mariakirken
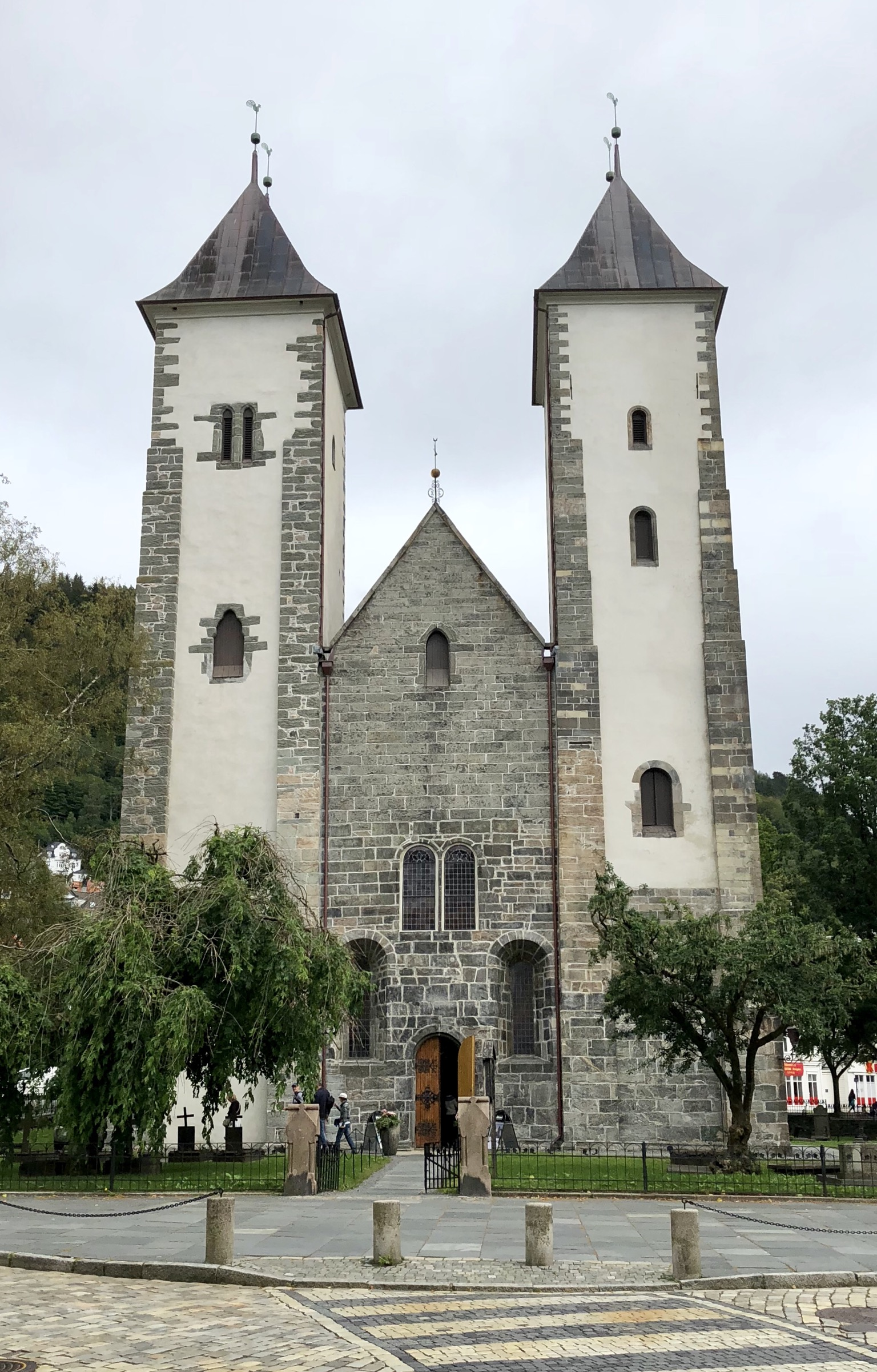
- View of the church, 2019
- St. Mary's Church
- 60°23′56″N 5°19′24″E
- Location: Bergen, Vestland
- Country: Norway
- Denomination: Church of Norway
- Previous denomination: Catholic Church
- Churchmanship: Evangelical Lutheran

History
- Status: Parish church
- Founded: 11th century
- Consecrated: 11th century

Architecture
- Functional status: Active
- Architectural type: Long church
- Style: Romanesque and Gothic
- Completed: c. 1180 (846 years ago)

Specifications
- Capacity: 240
- Materials: Stone

Administration
- Diocese: Bjørgvin bispedømme
- Deanery: Bergen domprosti
- Parish: Bergen domkirke
- Norwegian Cultural Heritage Site
- Type: Church
- Status: Automatically protected
- ID: 84395

St Mary's Church (Norwegian: Mariakyrkja, Mariakirken) is a parish church of the Church of Norway in Bergen Municipality in Vestland county, Norway. It is located in the Bryggen area in the central part of the city of Bergen. It is one of the churches for the Bergen Cathedral parish which is part of the Bergen domprosti (arch-deanery) in the Diocese of Bjørgvin. The large, gray stone church was built in a long church design using plans drawn up by an unknown architect. The church seats about 240 people. The construction of the church is believed to have started in the 1130s or 1140s and completed around 1180, making this church the oldest remaining building in the whole city of Bergen. There have been a few fires that burned the church, as well as several renovations and reconstructions, most recently in 2013.

== History ==
St. Mary's Church is the only remaining of the twelve churches and three monasteries that were built in Bergen between its beginnings during the reign of Olav Kyrre (1066–1093, traditionally 1070) and the end of the twelfth century. Excavations have revealed the remains of an earlier stone church on the site, but it was probably never completed. Commissioned jointly by the king and the citizens and merchants of Bergen, the construction of St. Mary's Church began in the 1130s or 1140s. The exact year of completion is unknown, but the church is mentioned in Sverris saga as where the rebels of the Birkebein Party sought refuge when attacked by a peasant army in 1183. St. Mary's Church is likely to have been built by craftsmen from Scania, then part of Denmark. The church's style is reminiscent of that of Lund Cathedral in Scania.

St. Mary's Church was significantly damaged in the town fire of 1198, caused by an attack on the city by the Bagli Party, enemies of the Birkebein Party. The rebuilding resulted in several architectural changes. Bergen burned again in 1248, in a fire which caused an even greater degree of destruction to the church than the earlier fire. As part of the reconstruction after this fire, the towers were heightened and the chancel lengthened. The church was damaged in several later town fires, but never again destroyed to the same degree as in the fire of 1248.

Although having been built as a parish church for the Norwegian population of Bergen, St. Mary's Church was taken over by the city's large German population in 1408 after which it was popularly called "the German church" (Tyskekirken). The merchants of the Hanseatic League were centered on this part of the town. By belonging to the wealthy Germans, St. Mary's is richly adorned and escaped the fate of being turned into a ruin, unlike several of the other churches in the city. It was not until 1874, long after the German domination in the city had vanished, did it again become an ordinary parish church, even though sermons were held in German until after the First World War.

In 1814, this church served as an election church (Norwegian: valgkirke). Together with more than 300 other parish churches across Norway, it was a polling station for elections to the 1814 Norwegian Constituent Assembly which wrote the Constitution of Norway. This was Norway's first national elections. Each church parish was a constituency that elected people called "electors" who later met together in each county to elect the representatives for the assembly that was to meet at Eidsvoll Manor later that year.

From 1863 until 1876, the architect Christian Christie (who would later supervise the restorations of Bergen Cathedral and the Haakon's Hall) oversaw a major restoration of the church. The church was again closed from January 2010 until 2015 for another major restoration work. Since then the church was made available to the Bergen Anglican Church, offering English language services for residents and tourists.

== Structure ==
St Mary's Church is a two-towered, three-naved, mainly Romanesque-style church. The eastern part of the choir shows some Gothic influence reminiscent of the Haakon's Hall, likely caused by the reconstruction after the 1248 fire. The church is constructed mainly in soapstone, the oldest parts being built of the highest quality soapstone. Shale is used sporadically. At least three different types of soapstone is used, and it is likely that the stone comes from several different quarries in the region.

== Media gallery ==
Exterior

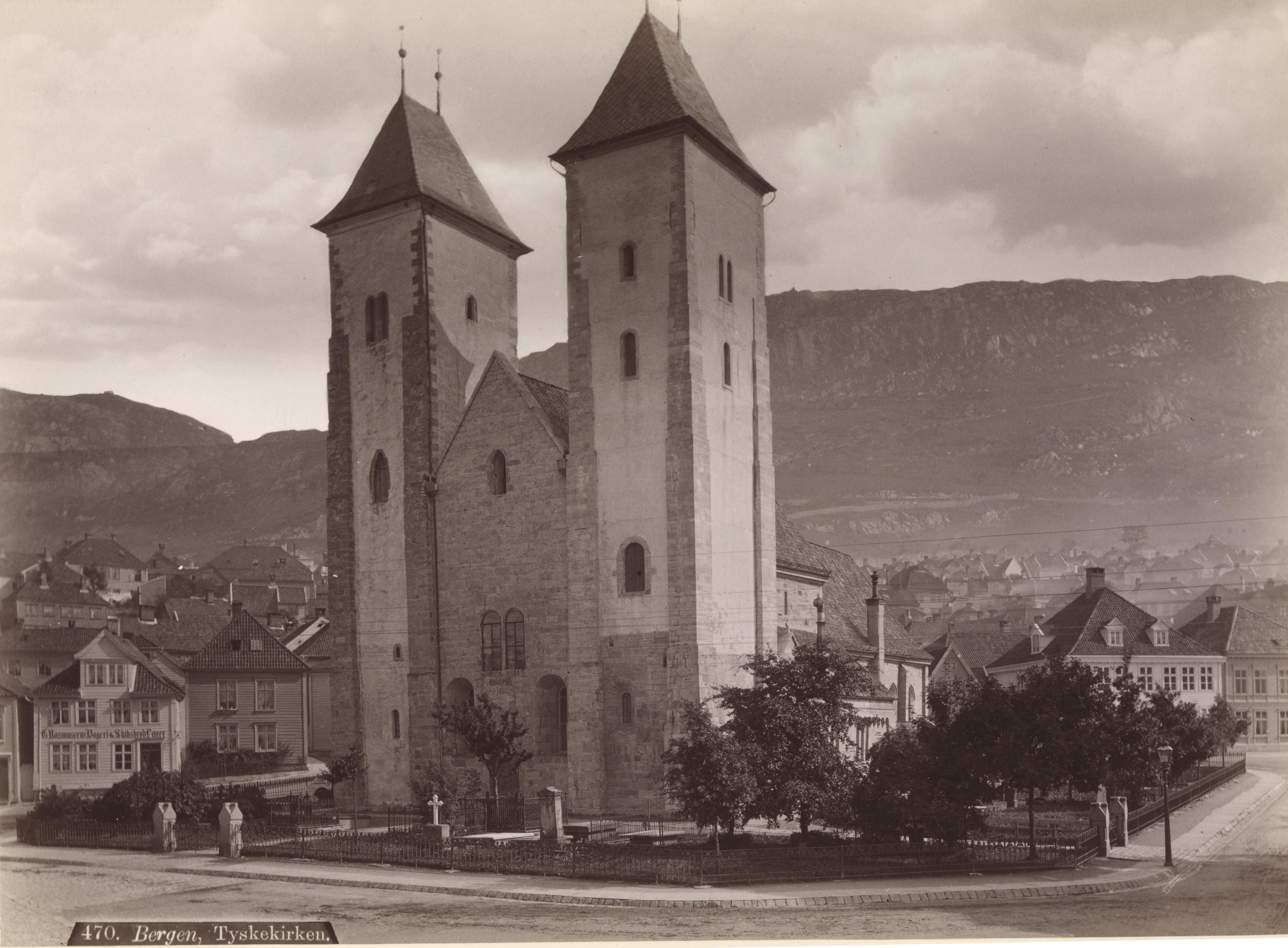
Photograph by Axel Lindahl from the 1800s

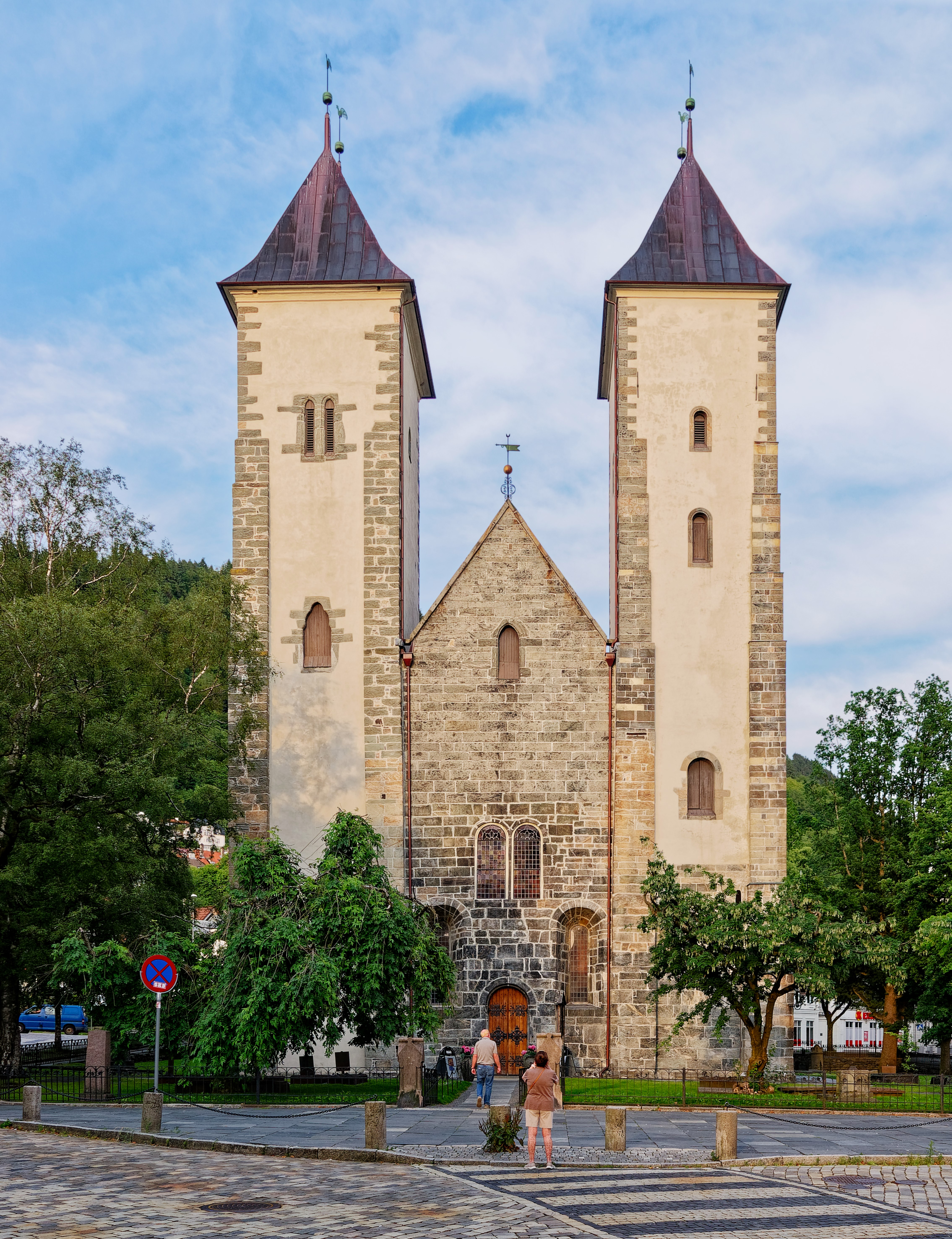
Front view

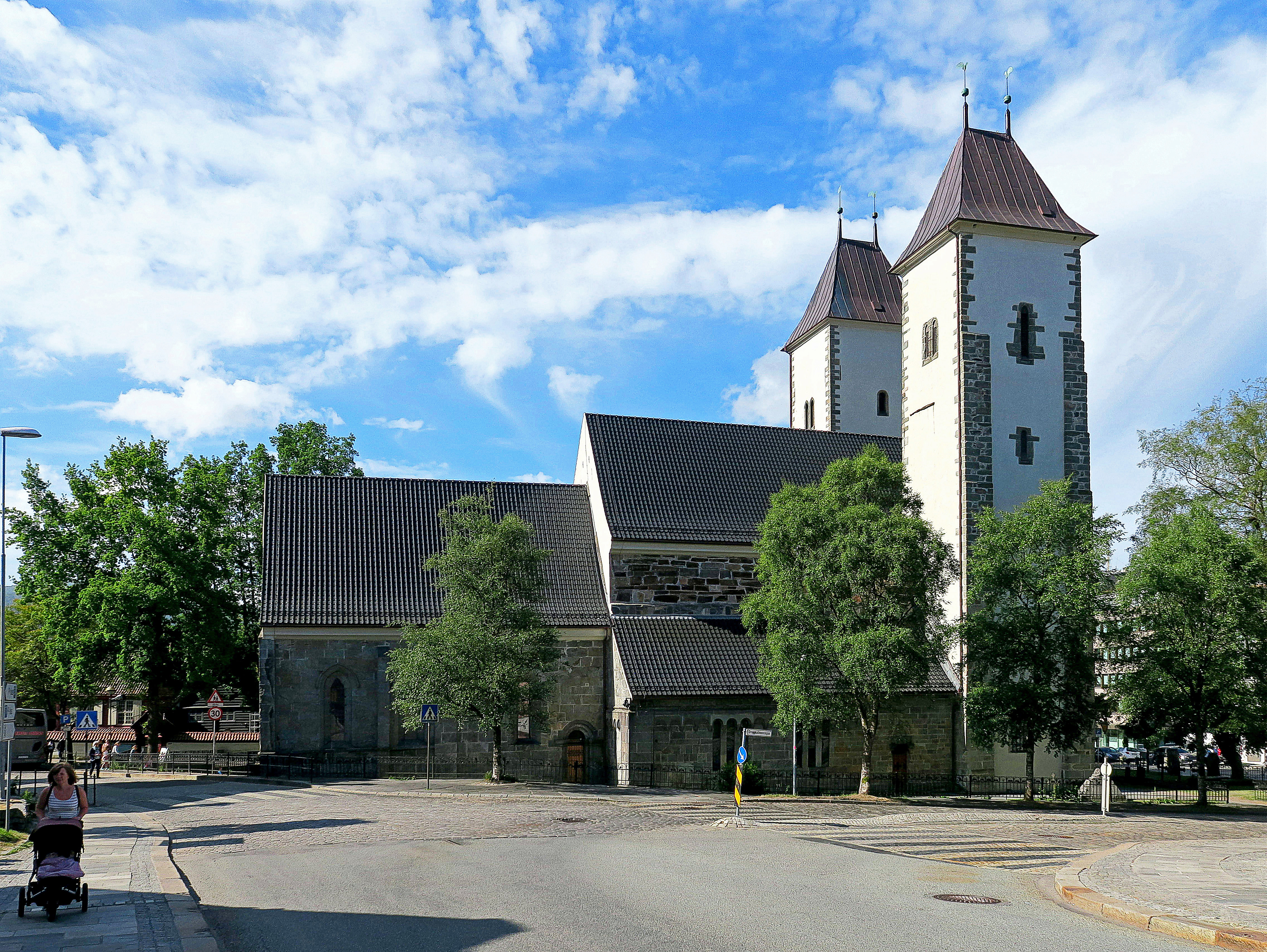
Side view

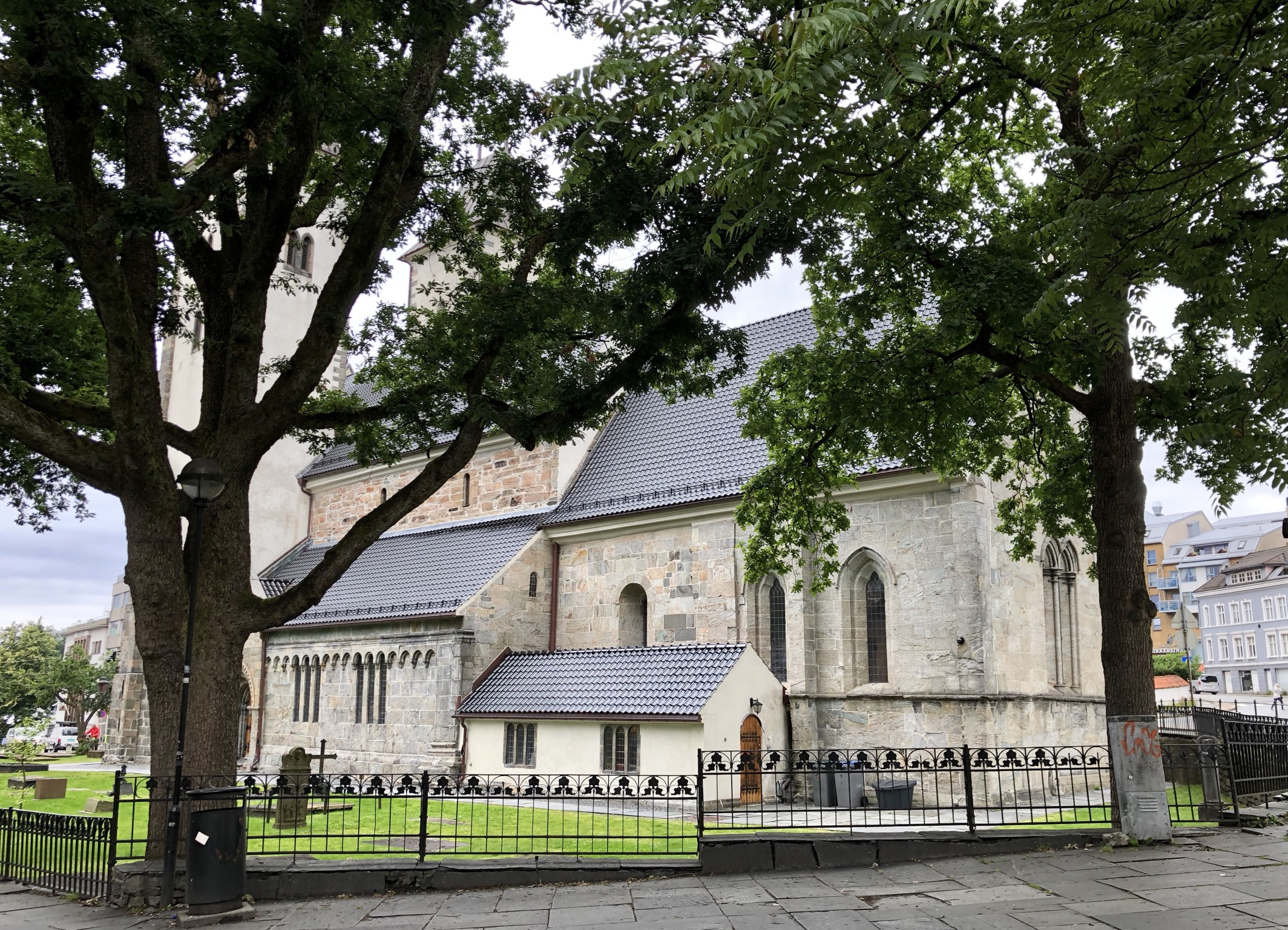

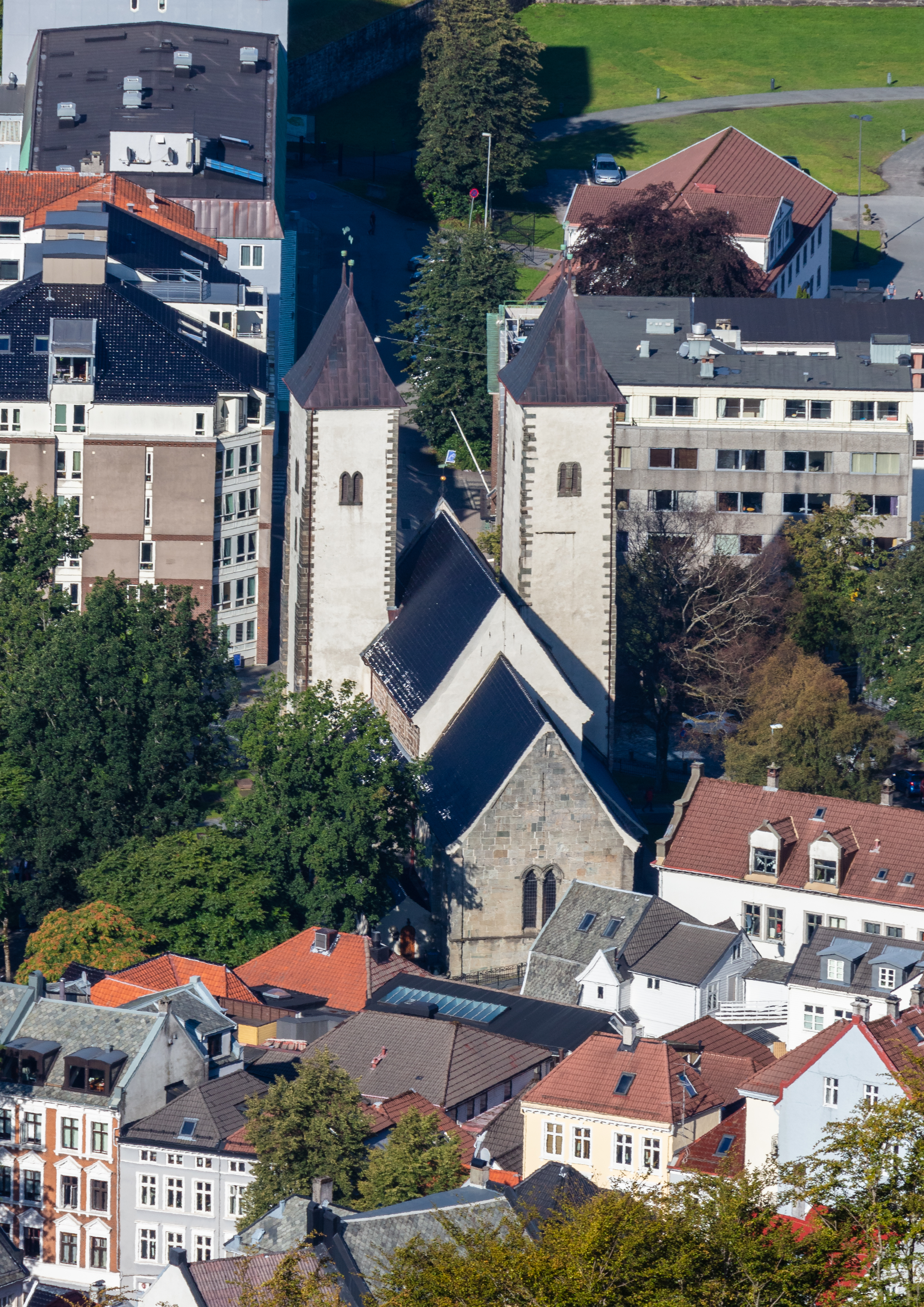
Far view
Interior

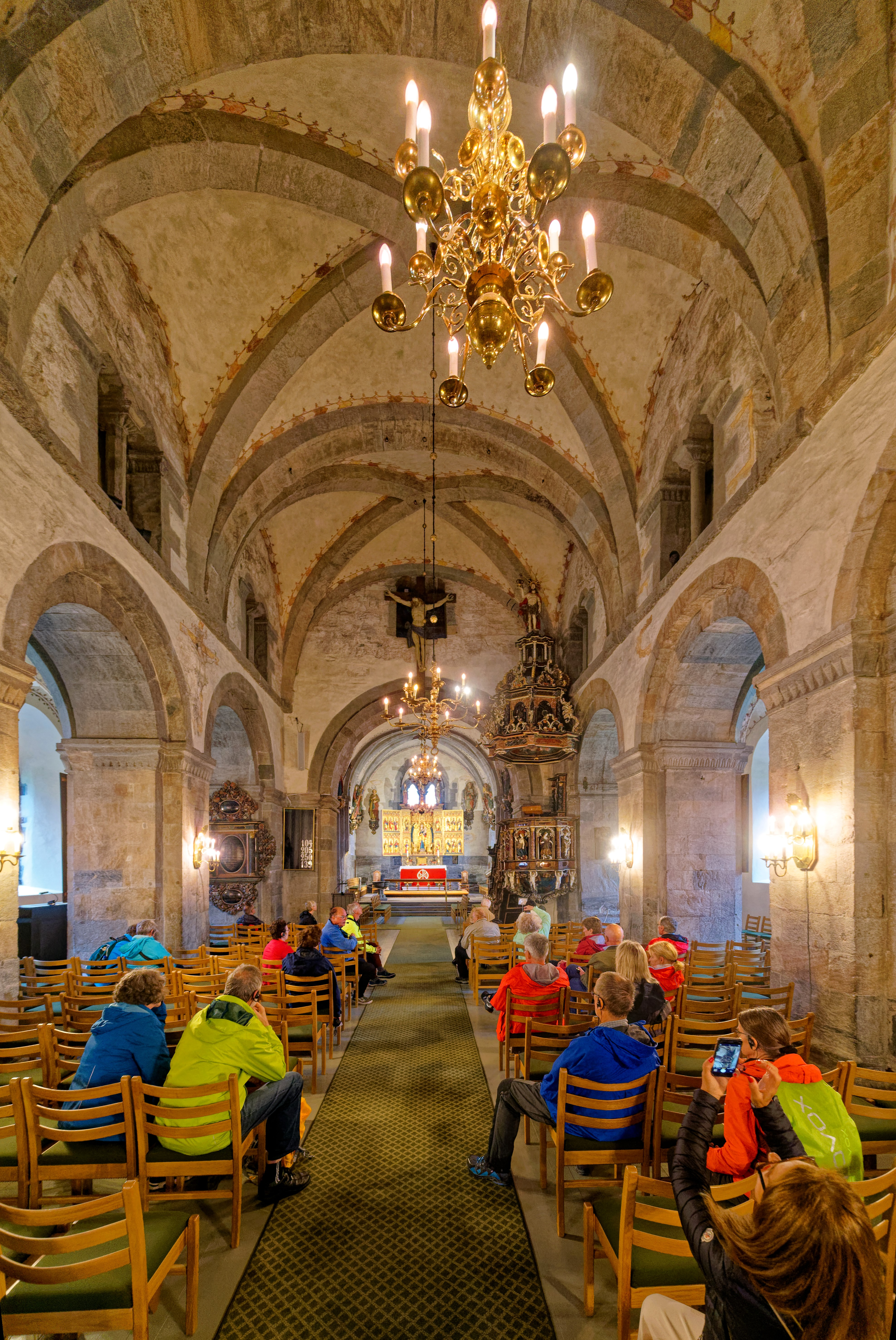
2023

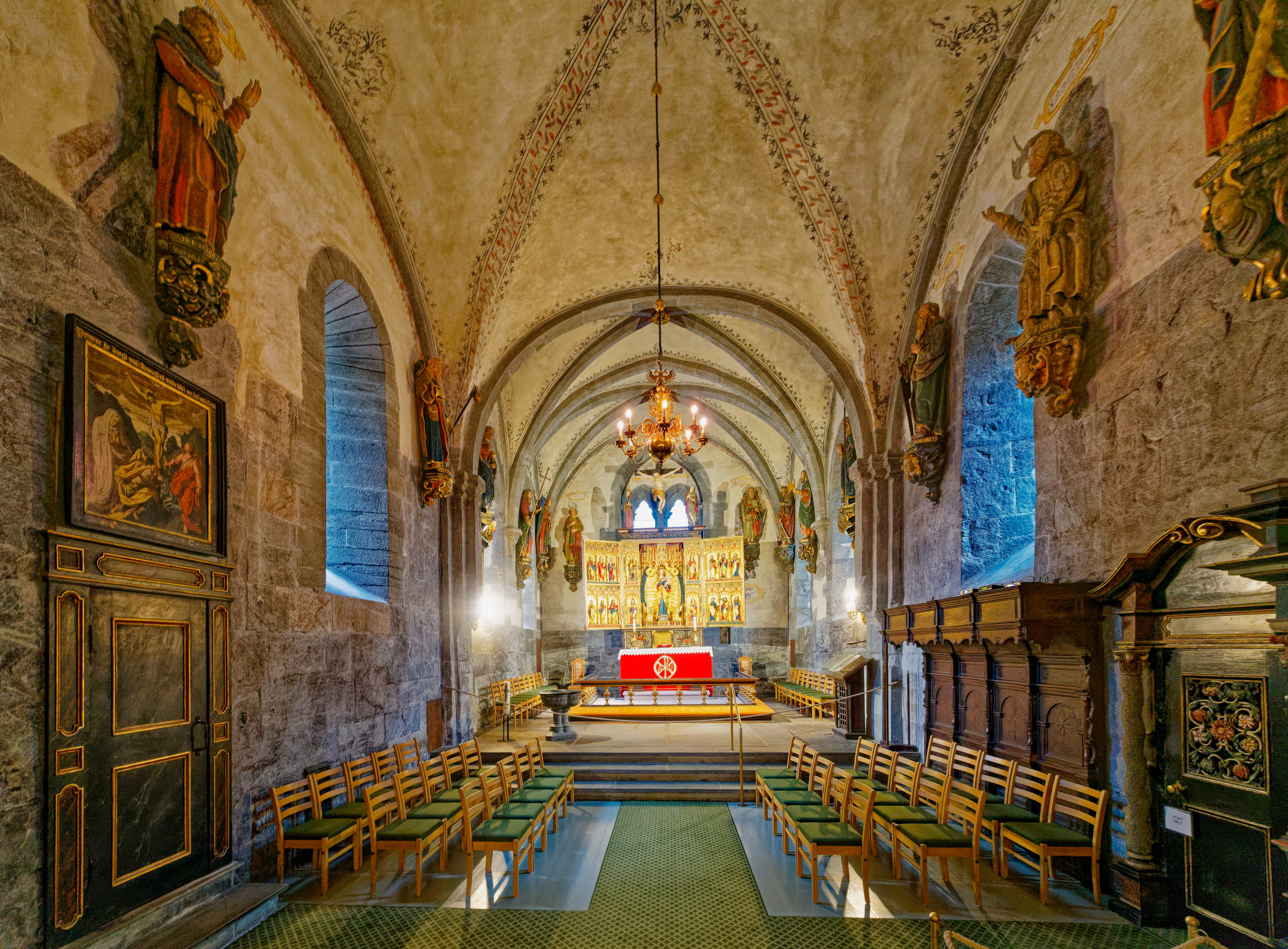

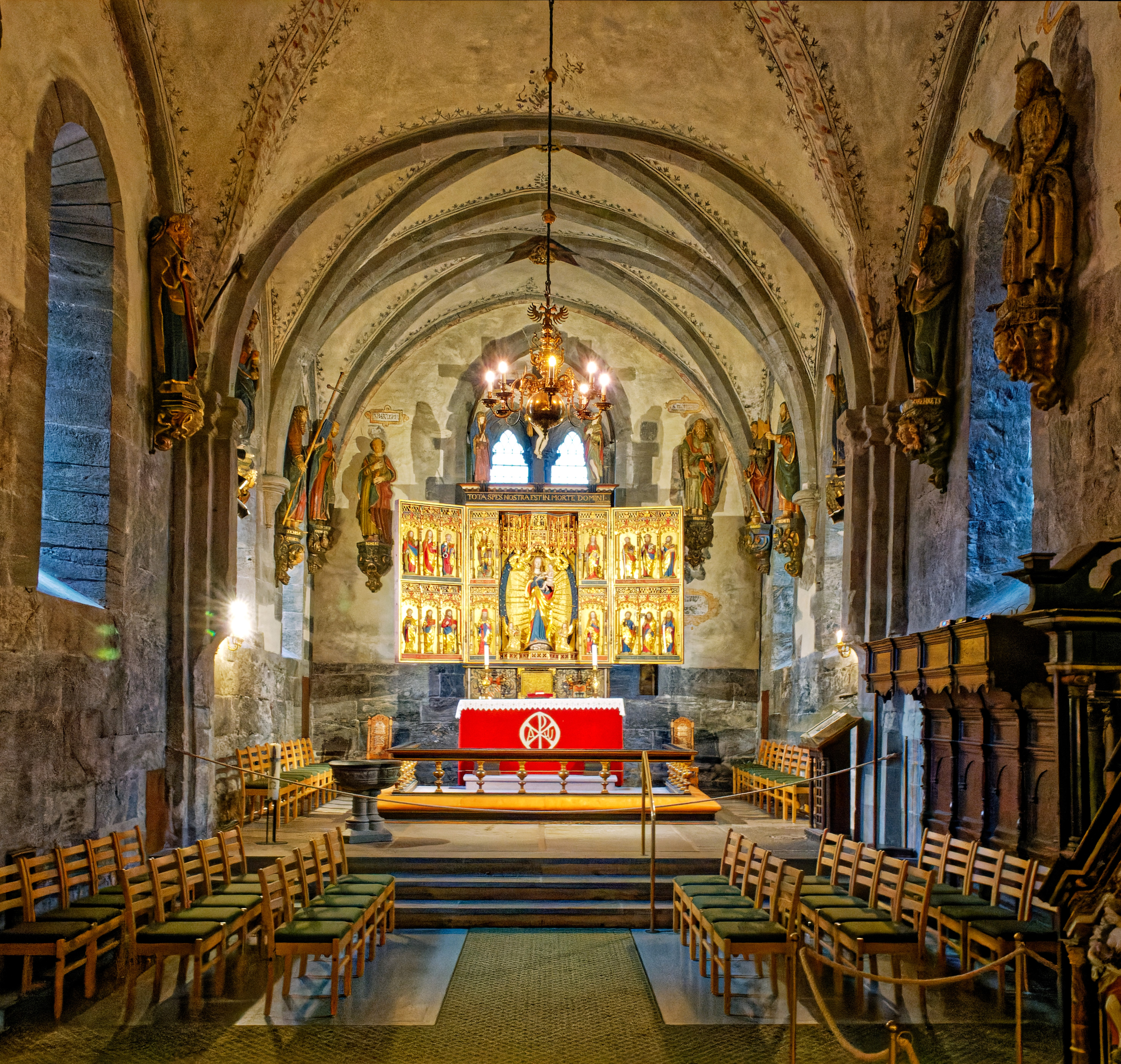
Altarpiece

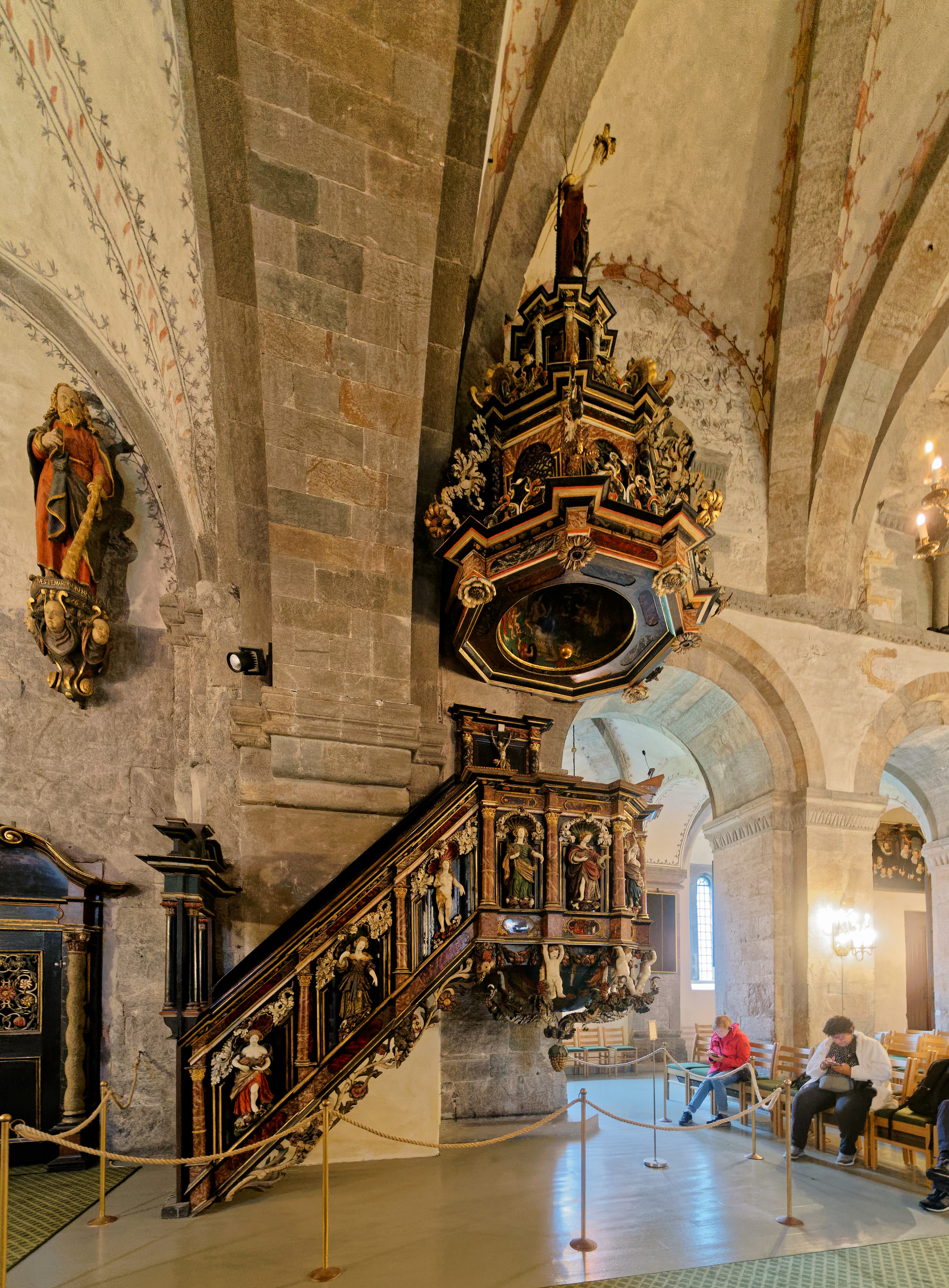
Pulpit

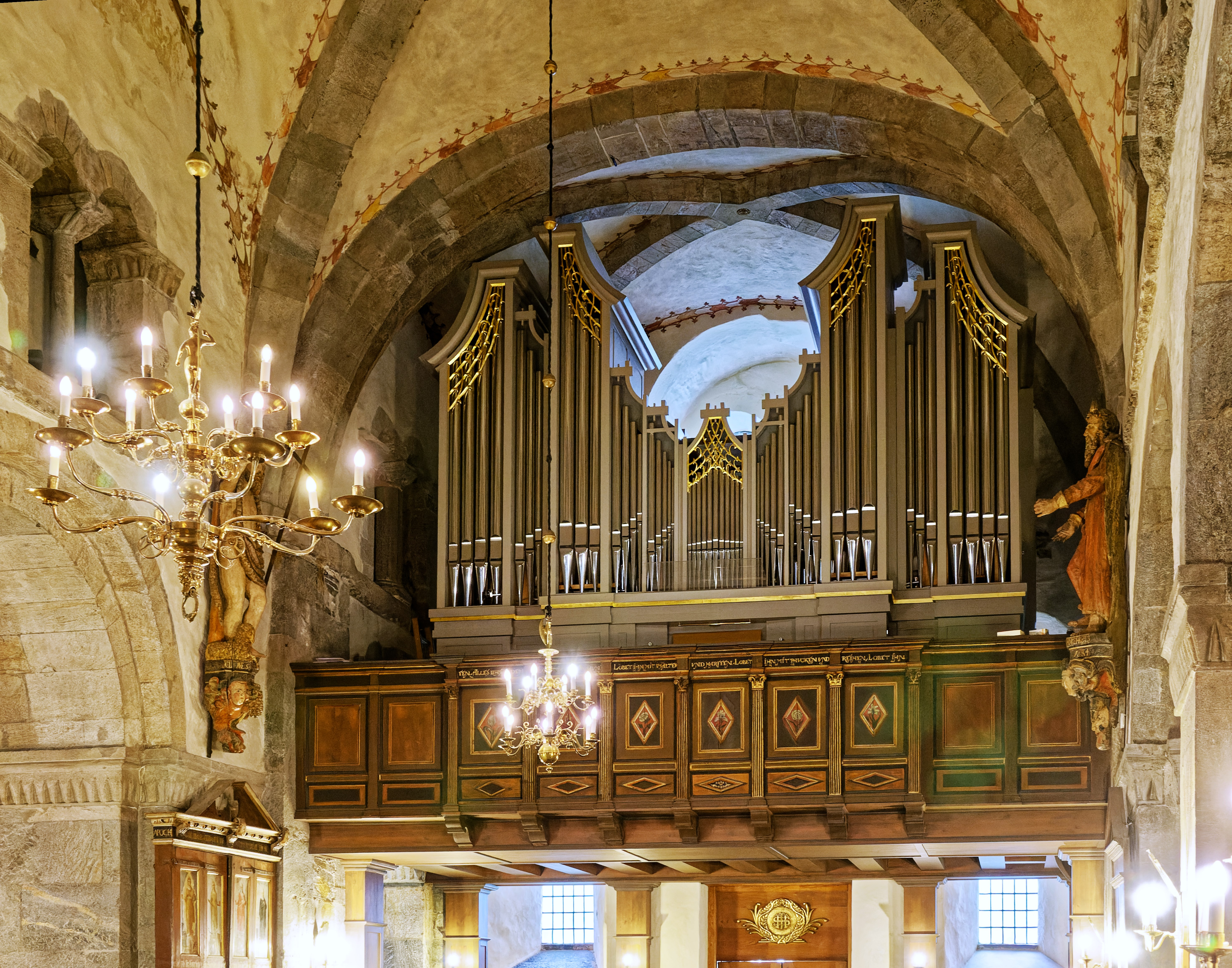

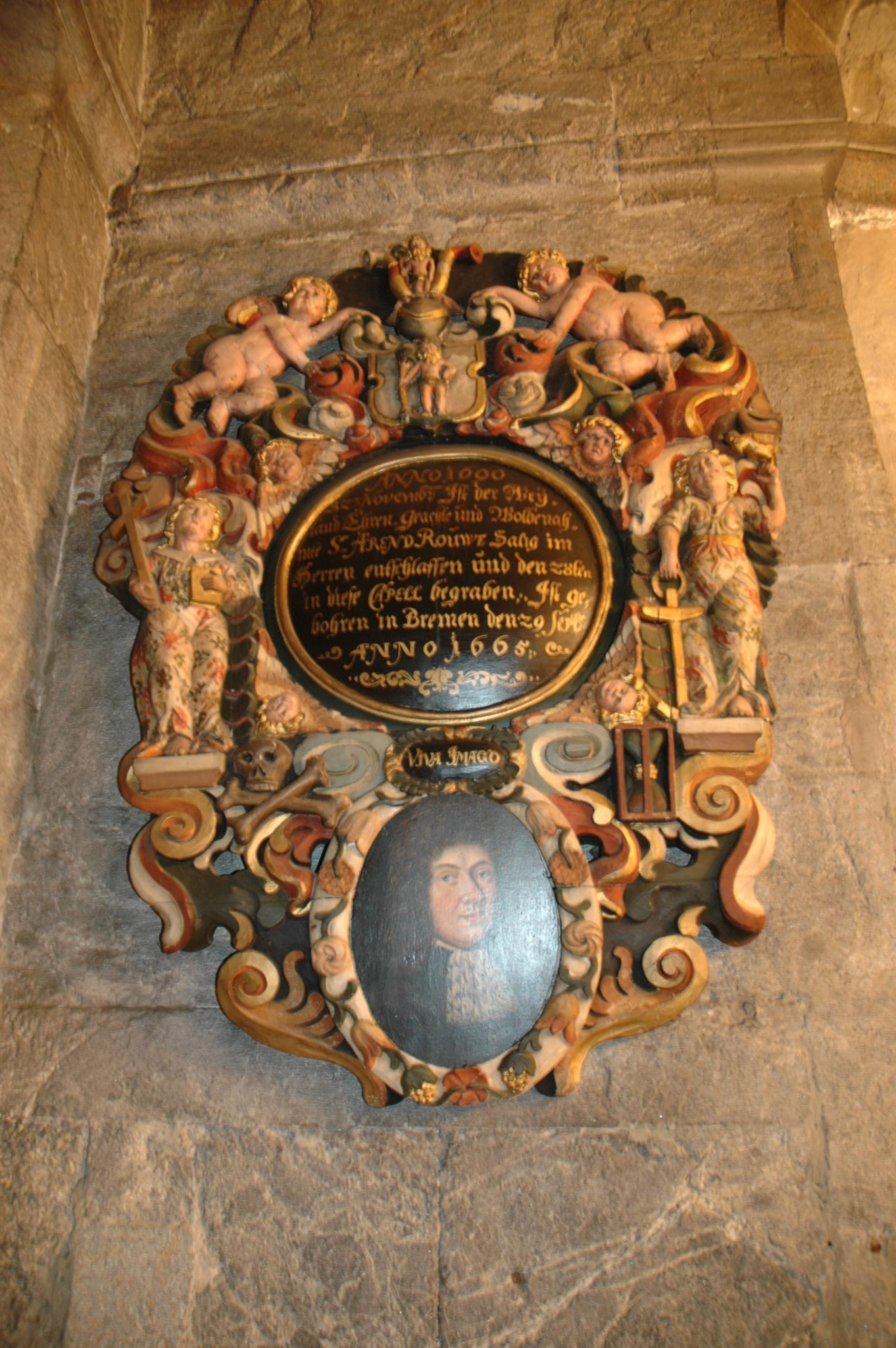
Interior decoration

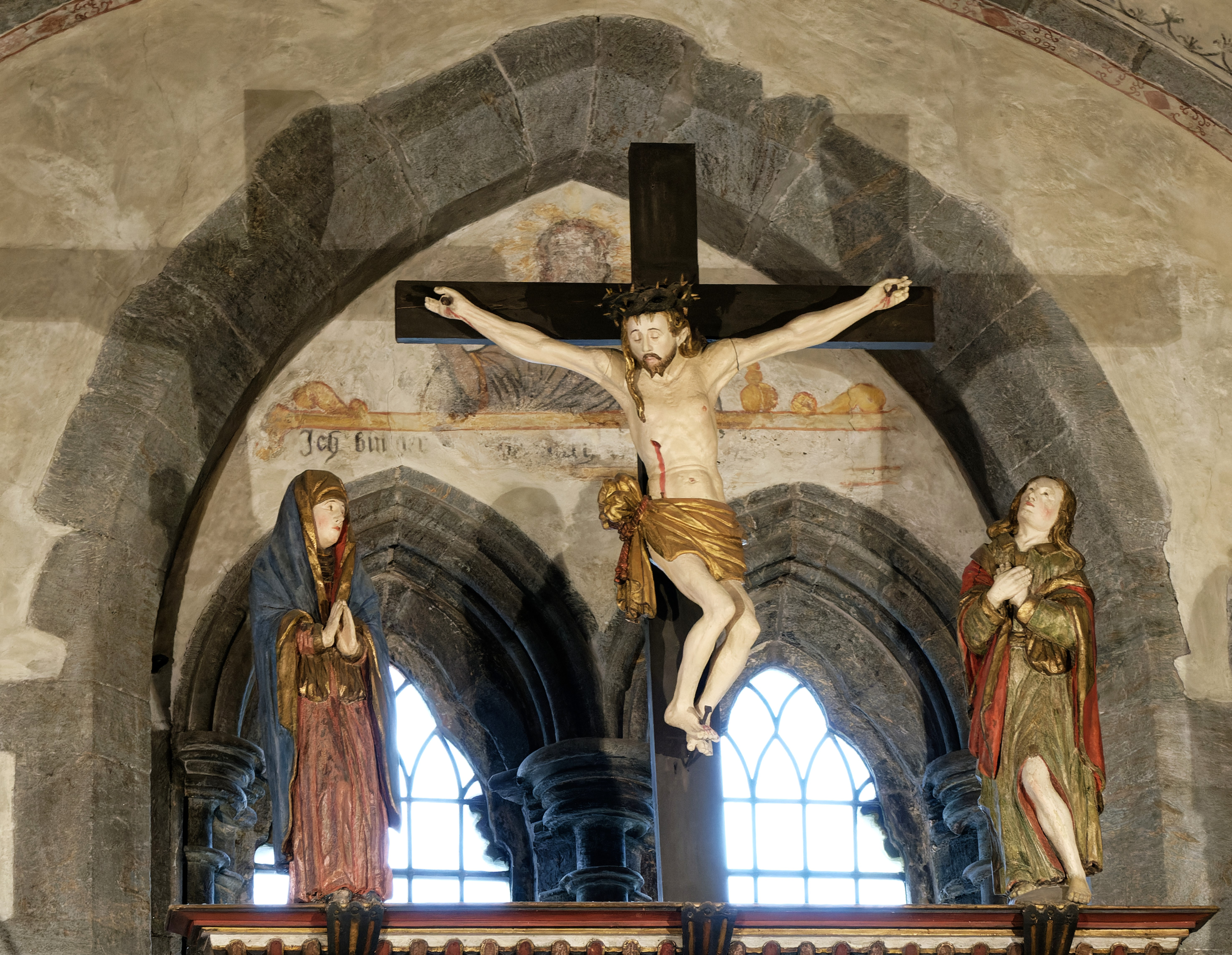
Crucifix

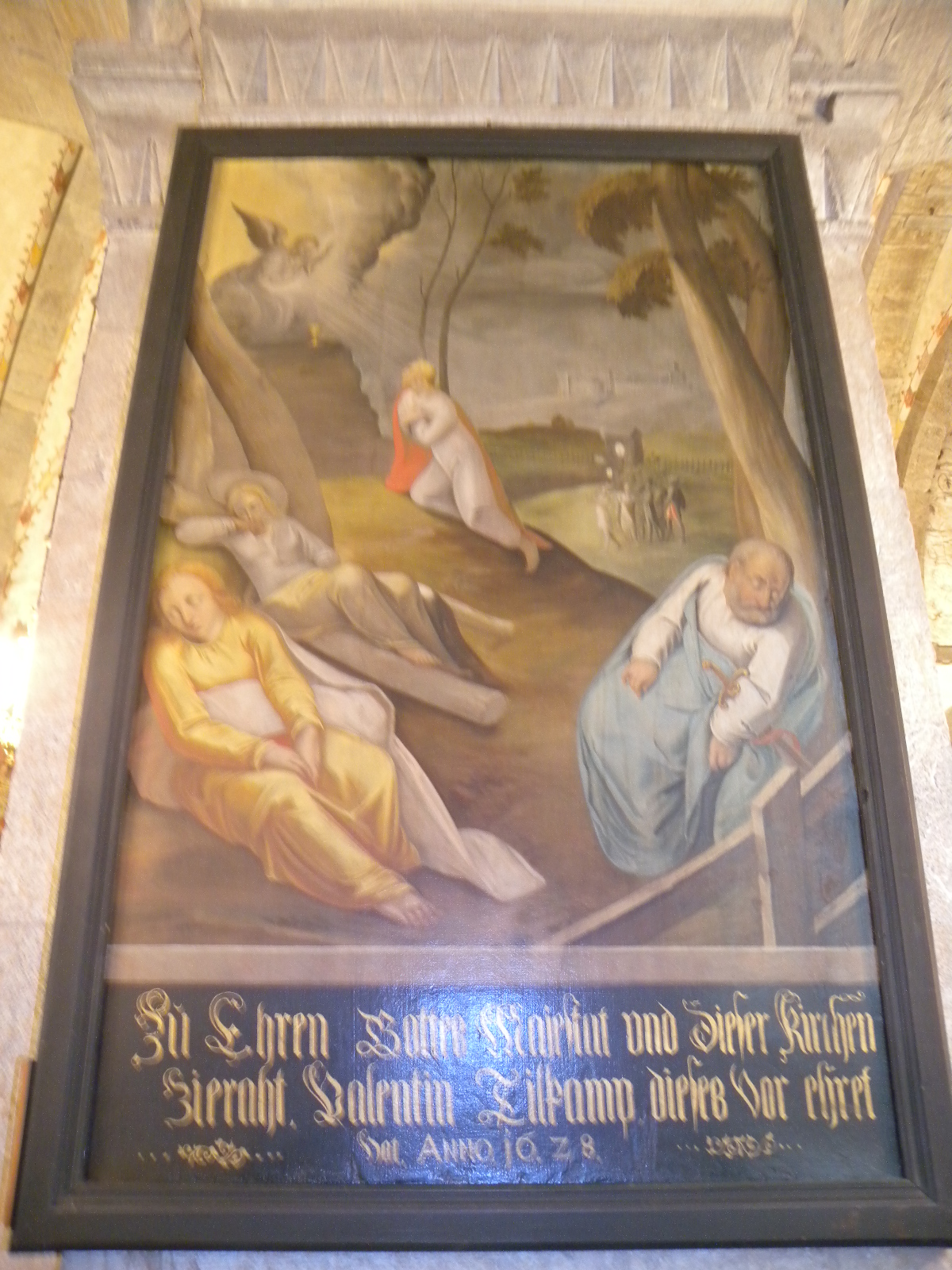
Wall painting

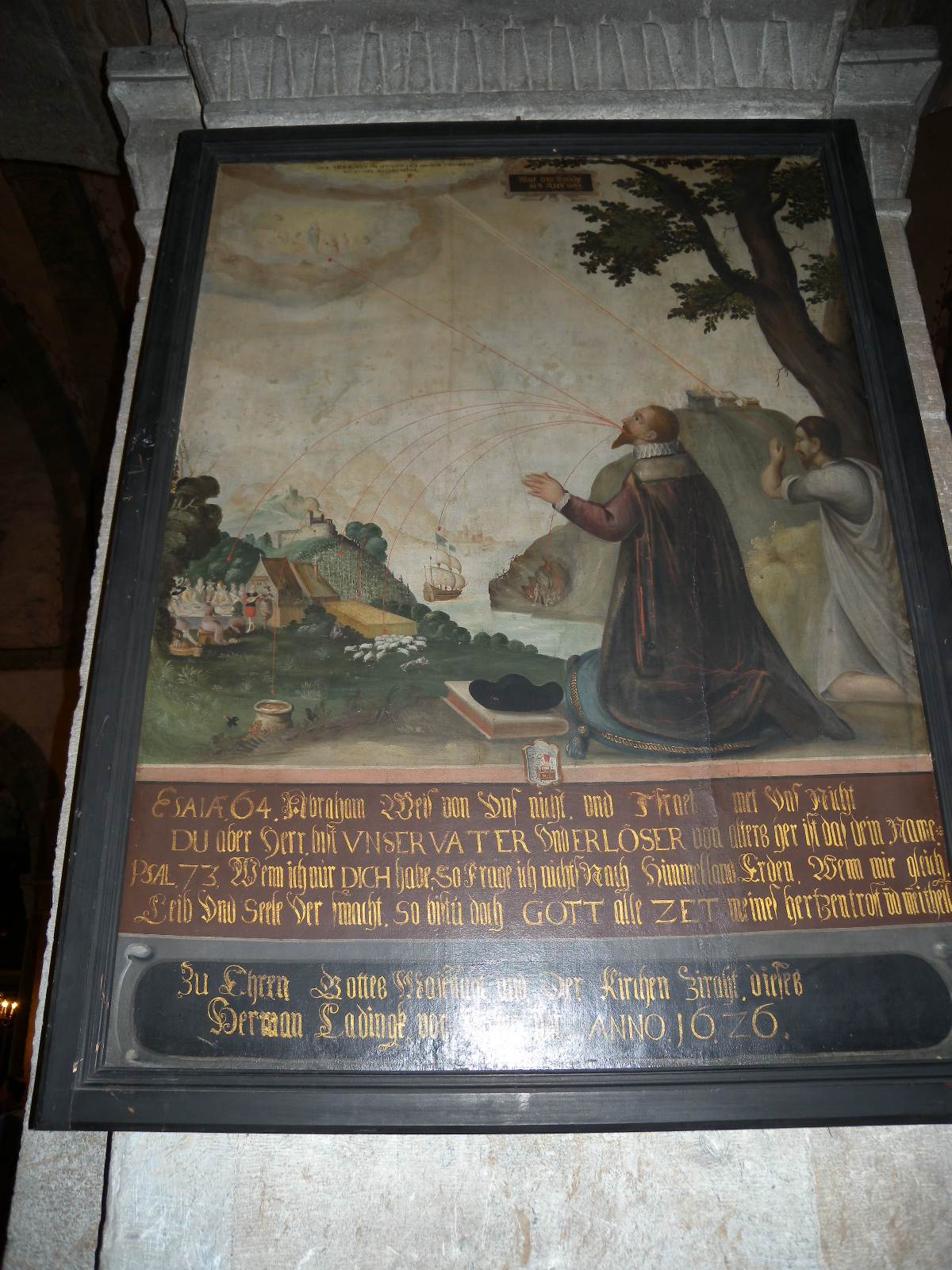
Another wall painting

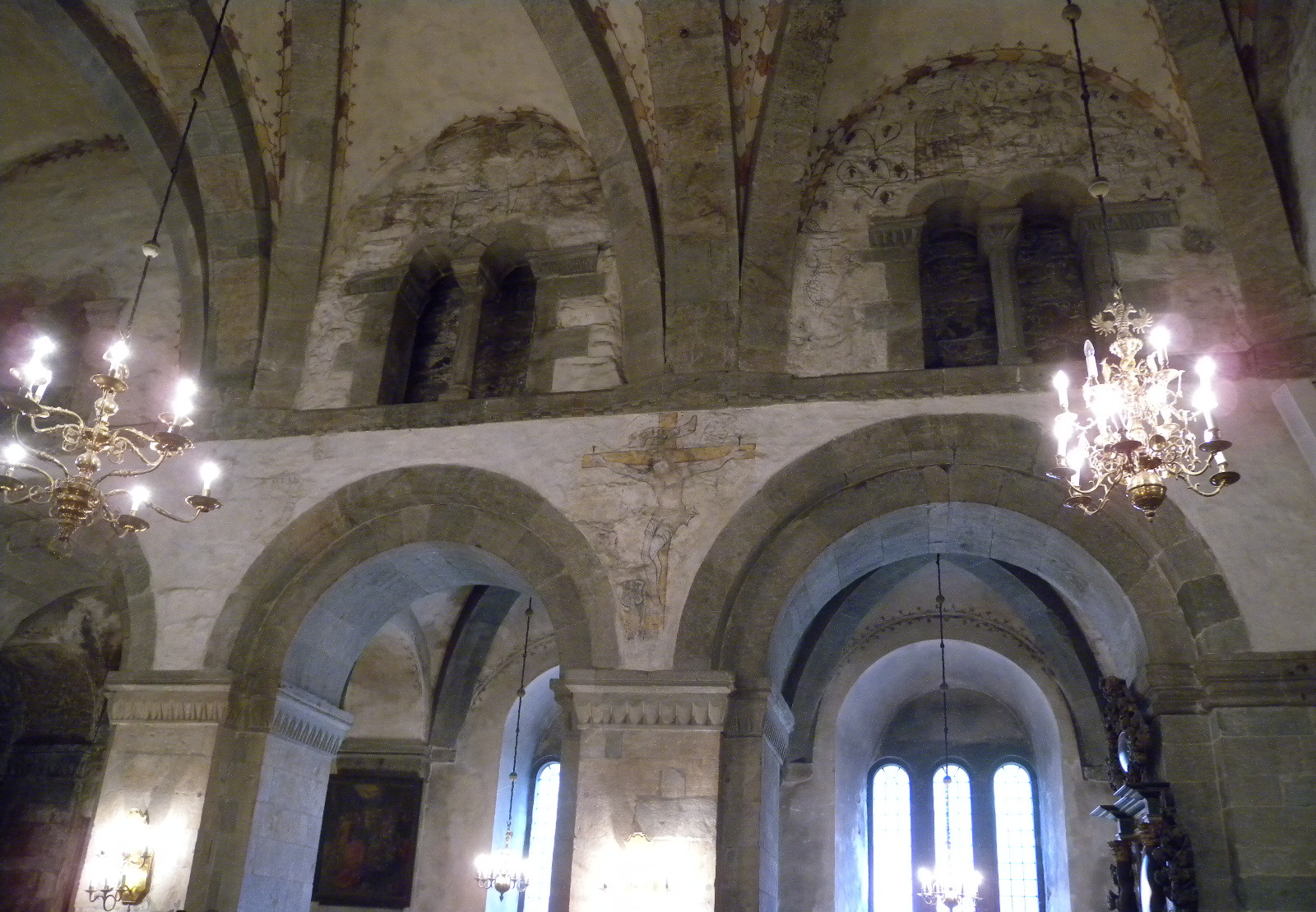
Side wall

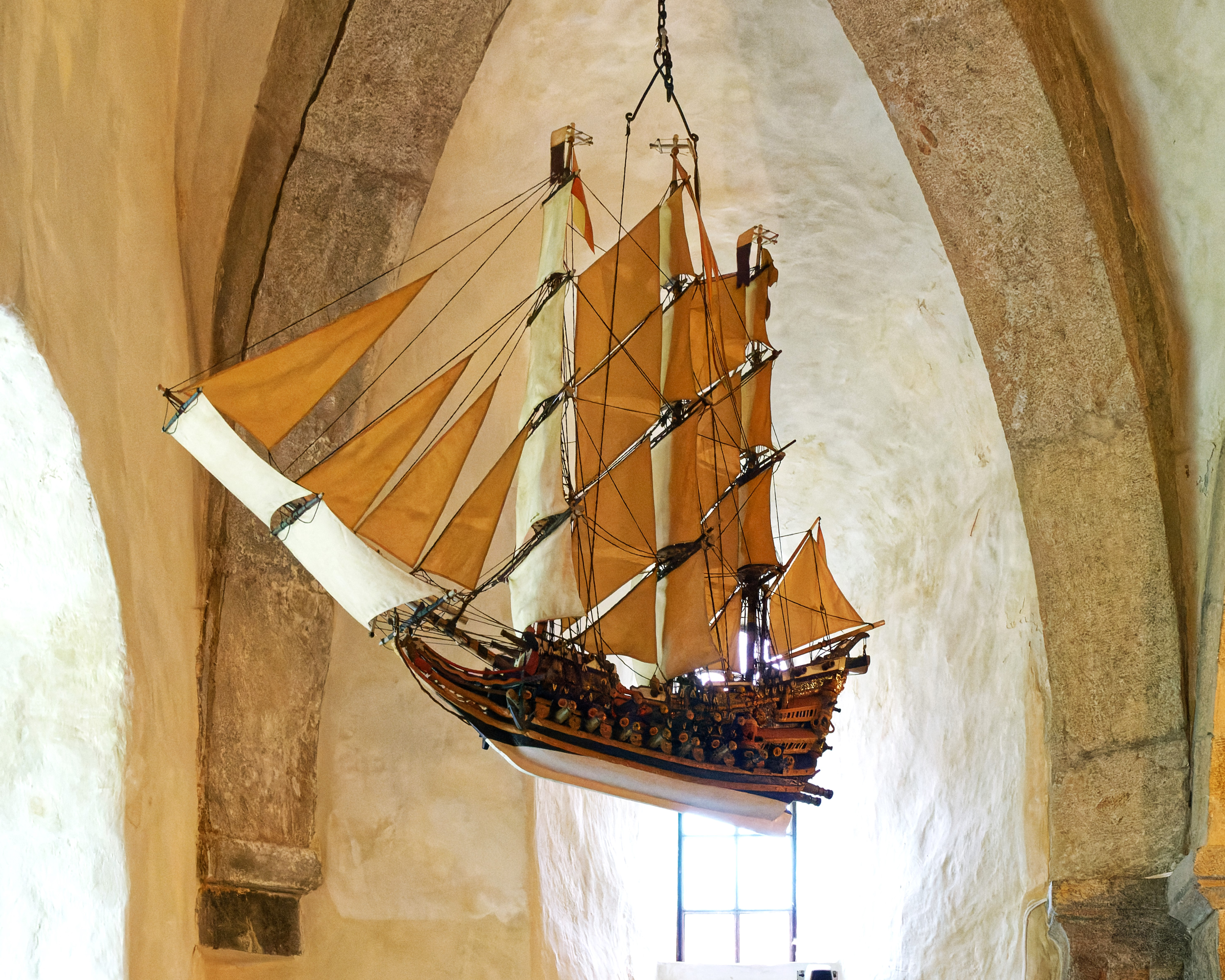
Ship

== See also ==
- List of churches in Bjørgvin
