= St. Edmund's Church, Oslo =

Coordinates: 59°55′0.30720″N 10°44′58.970″E

St. Edmund's Church
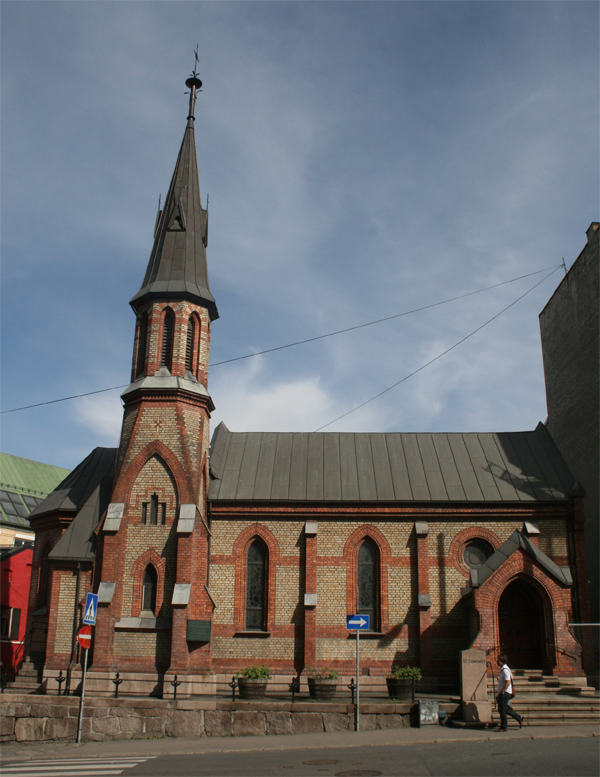
- St. Edmunds Church, the Anglican Church in Oslo
- St. Edmund's Church
- Location: Møllergata 30, Oslo
- Country: Norway
- Denomination: Church of England
- Website: www.osloanglicans.no

History
- Dedication: St Edmund

Architecture
- Architect(s): Paul Due, Bernhard Steckmest
- Style: Neo Gothic
- Years built: 1884

Administration
- Diocese: Diocese of Gibraltar in Europe

Clergy
- Bishop: Robert Innes

St. Edmund's Church is a small church in Møllergata in Oslo, Norway. It was built in 1883–84, and is home to the Norwegian congregation of the Church of England. The church was consecrated by the Bishop of Fulham on 27 July 1884.

Queen Maud used to visit this church, and there is a bust of her in the church, which otherwise is adorned with stained glass windows.

The church has a modest size. While churches often dominate their surroundings and towers stretch over neighbouring buildings, this church is modestly squeezed between larger buildings. It is said, however, that it came more into its own after some old buildings around it were demolished.

The church has – despite its small size – the shape of a cathedral. It was designed by architect Paul Due and Bernhard Steckmest, in yellow and red brick in a simple, neo-Gothic style. The church was restored in 1990, and the tower was then replaced with a new one of roughly the same shape and size as the original.

== See also ==
- Anglicanism in Norway
