= Anglicanism in Norway =

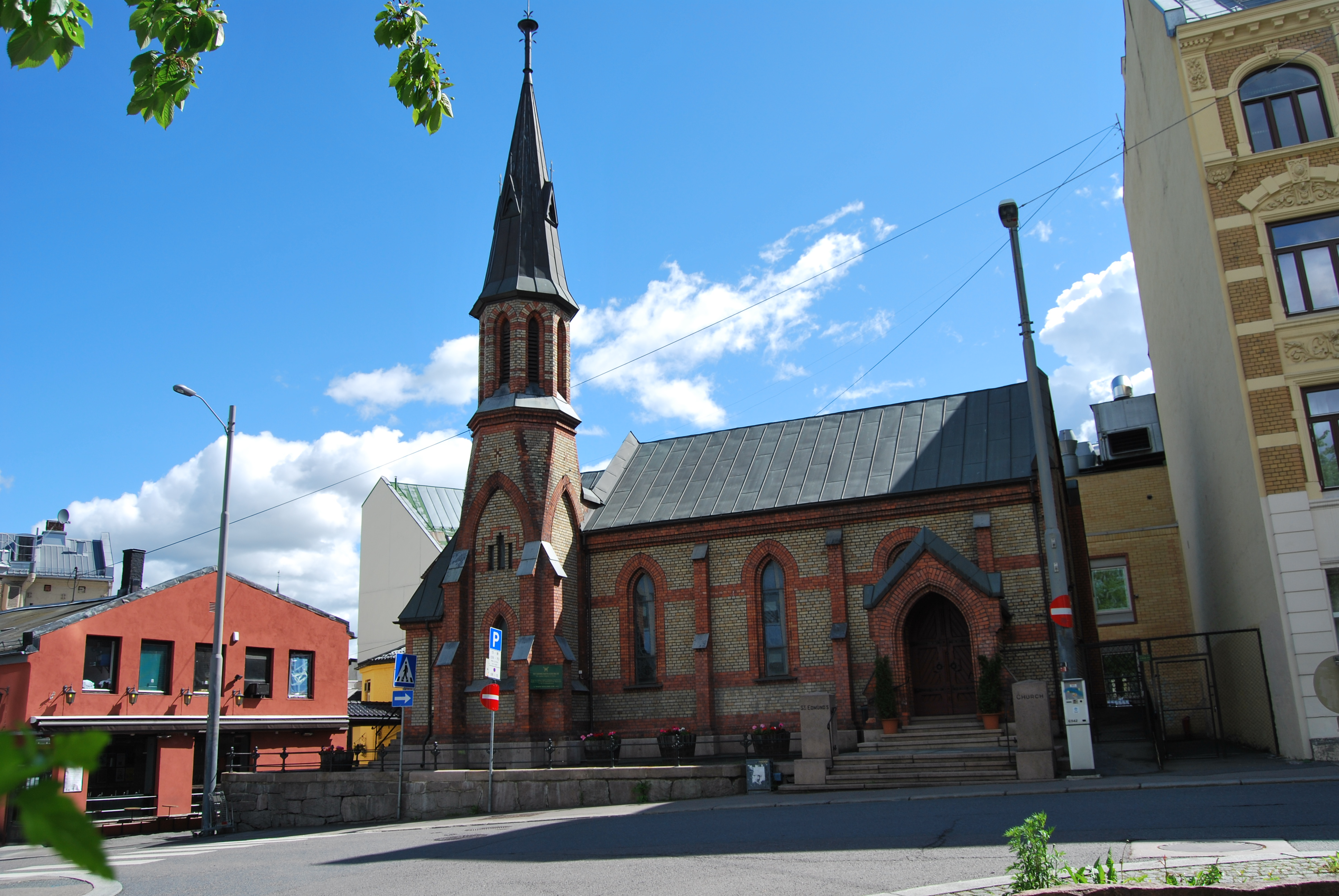
St. Edmund's Church, Oslo

Anglican congregations in Norway (Norwegian: Den anglikanske kirke i Norge) is a Protestant free church in Norway with a total official membership of 1,500 people in 2009 in 4 congregations, in Oslo, Bergen, Trondheim and Stavanger.

== History ==
English Christians had been in Norway since 1147 though the establishment of a Cistercian monastery that lasted until the Reformation in the 16th century. During the Industrial Revolution, British immigrants moved to work in Norway. By 1878, it was estimated by the British consulate there were 200 Anglicans worshipping privately in Norway. In 1881, Thomas Michell was appointed as the British Consul-General to Norway and worked to formalise Anglican worship in Norway. In 1882, he made plans for the Anglicans to have a church constructed, which resulted in St Edmund's Church, Oslo being constructed and consecrated by the Church of England's Bishop of Fulham in 1884. Norway's British-born Queen Maud was an Anglican adherent and worshipped at St Edmund's. Church of England congregations in Norway are a part of the Diocese of Europe. Following the Second World War, Anglicanism was seen as being influential in Norwegian theology and while discussions between Anglicans and Nordic churches in Norway the 1950s, nothing came of it due to concerns that it would cause doubts about the validity of the Nordic apostolic succession. Eventually, there grew to be four Church of England congregations in Norway by the 21st century.

As members of the Porvoo Communion, Anglicans in Norway enjoy a close ecumenical relationship with the Church of Norway and are in full communion which means they are permitted to perform Anglican services within Church of Norway churches and Cathedrals. This could be seen when the Archbishop of York was invited to preach at Old Moster Church in 2024 to celebrate 1,000 years of Christian law in Norway. Peter Hogarth, who had served for some years as the resident priest in Stavanger, also serving Bergen, was arrested and sentenced to six months in prison in 2019 for possession of images of child abuse.

== See also ==
- Christianity in Norway
- Bergen Anglican Church
- St Edmund's Church, Oslo
- St. Olaf's Church, Balestrand
